= Political positions of Joe Biden =

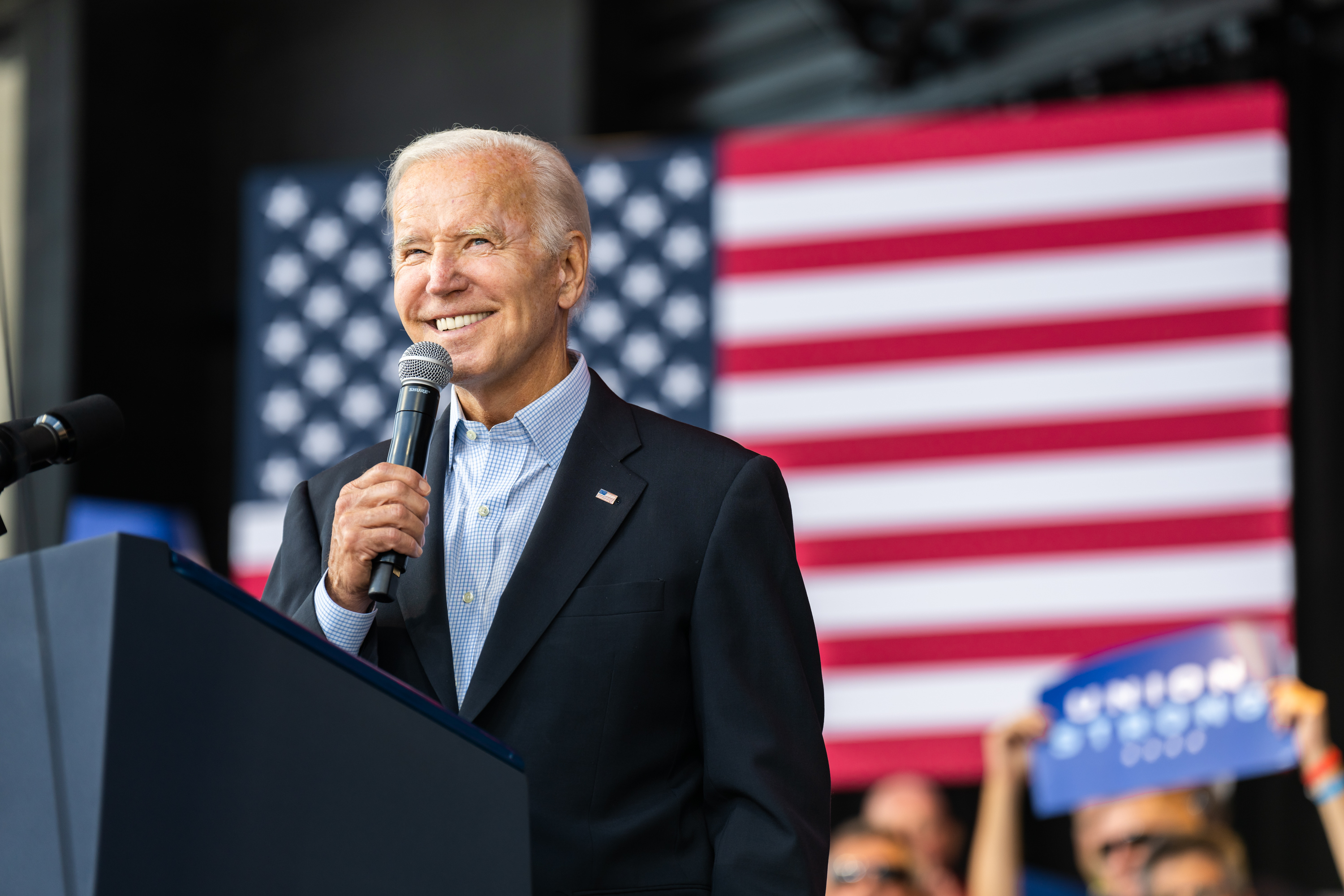
Joe Biden speaking at Henry Maier Festival Park in 2022

Joe Biden served as president of the United States from 2021 to 2025, vice president from 2009 to 2017, and in the United States Senate from 1973 until 2009. A member of the Democratic Party, he made his second presidential run in 2008, later being announced as Democratic presidential nominee Barack Obama's running mate in 2008. He was elected vice president in 2008 and re-elected in 2012. In April 2019, Biden announced his 2020 presidential campaign. He became the presumptive Democratic nominee in April 2020, was formally nominated by the Democratic Party in August 2020, and defeated Republican incumbent Donald Trump in the November 2020 election.

Over his career, Biden has generally been regarded as belonging to the mainstream of the Democratic Party. Biden has been described as center to center-left, and has described himself as the latter. Figures further to the left such as Bernie Sanders have criticized Biden for not embracing Medicare for All or the Green New Deal. Biden's policies emphasize the needs of middle-class and working-class Americans, and have drawn political support from those groups. Biden has supported campaign finance reform including the Bipartisan Campaign Reform Act and overturning Citizens United; the 1994 Violent Crime Control and Law Enforcement Act; the American Recovery and Reinvestment Act of 2009; student tax credits; carbon emissions cap and trade; the increased infrastructure spending proposed by the Obama administration; mass transit; renewable energy subsidies; student loan forgiveness; and reversals of Republican tax cuts for the wealthy and corporations. He supports building upon the Affordable Care Act through a public health insurance option instead of a single-payer system. He supports decriminalizing cannabis at the federal level and the right for states to legalize it. Biden has been publicly in favor of same-sex marriage since 2012 when he became the highest-ranking U.S. official to voice support for same-sex marriage, preempting Obama on the subject. He also supports the Roe v. Wade decision and since 2019 has been in favor of repealing the Hyde Amendment.

== Social issues ==
=== Abortion ===
==== Roe v. Wade ====
In a 2019 article about Biden's record on abortion, his press secretary Jamal Brown said that when Biden arrived in the Senate in 1973 he thought Roe v. Wade was wrongly decided, but now "firmly believes that Roe v. Wade is the law of the land and should not be overturned". In 1981, he voted for a failed constitutional amendment allowing states to overturn Roe v. Wade. In 1982, he voted against the same failed constitutional amendment allowing states to overturn Roe, and in 2006, he stated in an interview that "I do not view abortion as a choice and a right. I think it's always a tragedy[.]" He now says he would consider codifying the Roe precedent into federal law in case the United States Supreme Court overturns the ruling. He pledged that he would appoint United States Supreme Court justices who shared his beliefs in upholding Roe.

==== Federal abortion funding ====
From 1976 to June 5, 2019, Biden supported the Hyde Amendment. On June 6, 2019, Biden reversed his support and now supports repealing the Hyde Amendment. In 1981, he voted to end federal funding for abortion for victims of rape and incest. Biden previously supported the Mexico City policy, but now supports repealing it.

==== Partial Birth Abortion ====
Despite voting for the Partial-Birth Abortion Ban Act of 2003, he opposed the 2007 United States Supreme Court ruling in Gonzales v. Carhart which upheld the act. He later clarified that he agreed with the decision but not the court's reasoning.

=== Busing and affirmative action ===
In the mid-1970s, Biden was one of the Senate's leading opponents of race-integration busing. His Delaware constituents strongly opposed it, and such opposition nationwide later led his party to mostly abandon school integration policies.

In his first Senate campaign, Biden expressed support for busing to remedy de jure segregation, as in the South, but opposed its use to remedy de facto segregation arising from racial patterns of neighborhood residency, as in Delaware; he opposed a proposed constitutional amendment banning busing entirely. In May 1974, Biden voted to table a proposal containing anti-busing and anti-desegregation clauses but later voted for a modified version containing a qualification that it was not intended to weaken the judiciary's power to enforce the 5th Amendment and 14th Amendment.

Later, Biden was heckled at a meeting of Delaware anti-busing parents over his opposing vote on a Senate bill that would have created criteria for busing mandates that restricted their use to only certain situations, such as to remedy de jure and not de facto segregation, and "that would have permitted jurisdictions facing [busing] to return to court and possibly have their busing mandate vacated" if the mandate didn't meet those criteria. Biden believed it would be better for the courts, instead of a law, to define such criteria for busing mandates. Despite this, the prospect of a busing plan in Wilmington, along with his opposition to busing requirements outside of de jure segregated areas, led Biden to align himself with anti-busing senators. In 1975, he supported a proposal that would have prevented the Department of Health, Education, and Welfare from cutting federal funds to districts that refused to integrate; he said busing was a "bankrupt idea [violating] the cardinal rule of common sense" and that his opposition would make it easier for other liberals to follow suit. At the same time he supported initiatives on housing, job opportunities, and voting rights.

In 1977, Biden co-sponsored an amendment to a spending bill that closed loopholes in a measure forbidding the use of federal funds for transporting students beyond the school closest to them. Around that time, he made the remark that if busing integration was done too disorderly and without forethought, his children might grow up in a "racial jungle with tensions having built so high that it is going to explode at some point". The measure was passed along with the bill, which President Jimmy Carter signed into law in 1978.

Biden has supported affirmative action policies.

=== Capital punishment ===
Since June 20, 2019, Biden opposes capital punishment. Biden supports legislation to eliminate capital punishment at the federal level and incentivize states to abolish capital punishment. He supports individuals on death row instead serving life sentences without probation or parole. Prior to June 20, 2019, he had supported capital punishment. He originally wrote the Violent Crime Control and Law Enforcement Act of 1994. The Act included Title VI, the Federal Death Penalty Act, creating 60 new death penalty offenses under 41 federal capital statutes, for crimes related to acts of terrorism, murder of a federal law enforcement officer, civil rights-related murders, drive-by shootings resulting in death, the use of weapons of mass destruction resulting in death, and carjackings resulting in death. However, he voted against limiting appeals in capital cases and also opposed rejecting racial statistics in death penalty appeals.

On December 23, 2024, Biden commuted the sentences of 37 of the 40 individuals on federal death row to life imprisonment without the possibility of parole. The exceptions are Dylann Roof, Robert Gregory Bowers, and Dzhokhar Tsarnaev, who received death sentences for terrorism or hate-motivated mass murder-related crimes, as well as all four prisoners on US Military death row

=== Crime ===
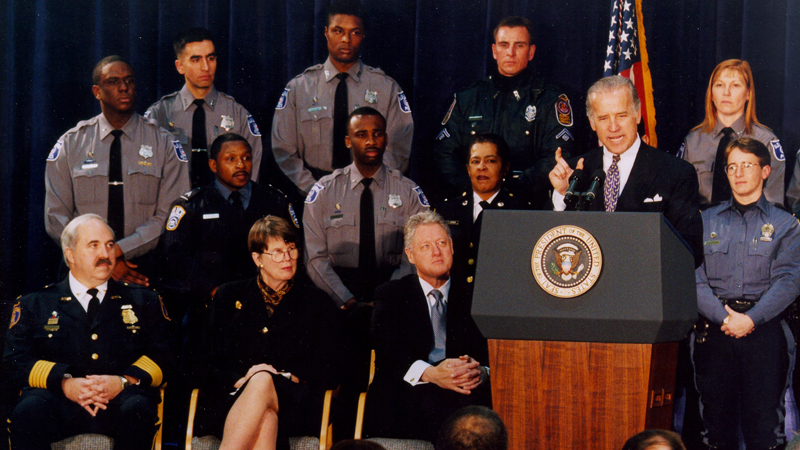
Senator Biden speaking at the 1994 Crime Bill's signing with Attorney General Janet Reno and President Bill Clinton

Biden helped author the 1994 Violent Crime Control and Law Enforcement Act, which deployed and trained more police officers, increased prison sentences, and built more prisons. The bill led to a decrease in crime rates while also introducing the Violence Against Women Act. Part of the bill was an assault weapon ban and additional money was redirected towards crime prevention programs. Some critics say that the law had the unintended by-effect of creating a financial incentive for jailing people and keeping them there for longer periods of time; this had a disproportionate impact on minorities.

In the aftermath of the murder of George Floyd, a slogan of "defund the police" arose, which some interpreted to mean the abolition of police departments. Biden stated in a June 2020 opinion piece, "While I do not believe federal dollars should go to police departments violating people's rights or turning to violence as the first resort, I do not support defunding police." President Donald Trump and his allies have claimed that Biden supports "defunding police"; the Trump campaign spent at least $20 million in July 2020 on campaign ads promoting the falsehood. As a senator, Biden had long forged deep relationships with police groups and was a chief proponent of a Police Officer's Bill of Rights measure which was supported by police unions but opposed by police chiefs. As a 2020 presidential candidate, Biden faced criticism from some on the left for his proposal to double federal spending for community policing programs, to $300 million. He called for racial justice while speaking at George Floyd's funeral service. In September 2020, he condemned the institutional racism in the United States and police violence against African American communities.

=== Drugs ===
Biden earned a reputation for being a "drug warrior", leading efforts in the war on drugs. During the 1980s crack epidemic when both Democrats and Republicans were "tough on crime", Biden was the head of the Senate Judiciary Committee that passed numerous punitive measures against drug offenders. In 1986, Biden sponsored and co-wrote the Anti-Drug Abuse Act which caused a large disparity between the sentencing of crack cocaine and powder cocaine users. Black drug users were more likely than whites to use crack and hence were incarcerated in larger numbers. He later acknowledged the negative consequences of the legislation and in 2010 supported the Fair Sentencing Act. The bill eliminated the five-year mandatory minimum prison term for first-time possession of crack cocaine, and aimed to reduce the disparity in sentencing between crack and powder cocaine offenses.

Biden favored increased funding for anti-drug efforts. He frequently criticized President Ronald Reagan in this regard, stating in 1982 that the administration's "commitment is minuscule in terms of dollars". He also criticized President George H. W. Bush's anti-drug strategy as "not tough enough, bold enough or imaginative enough", stating that "what we need is another D-Day, not another Vietnam, not a limited war, fought on the cheap". In 1982, Biden advocated for the creation of a drug czar, a government official overseeing all anti-drug operations. This led to the establishment of the Office of National Drug Control Policy by the Anti-Drug Abuse Act of 1988. Biden also supported increased penalties against those caught selling drugs within 1,000 feet of schools.

Biden advocated for increased use of civil asset forfeiture by law enforcement agencies. Biden played a key part in the passage of the Comprehensive Forfeiture Act in 1983, partnering with Strom Thurmond, a conservative Republican. A Washington Post article described Biden's role in the negotiations: "He got the Democrats to agree to strengthen forfeiture laws and allow judges to hold more defendants without bail; he persuaded the Republicans to drop such controversial provisions as a federal death penalty, and he made sure Thurmond got most of the credit. Civil liberties groups said the measure could have been far worse without Biden."

In the early 2000s, Biden was critical of raves, describing most of them as "havens" for use of ecstasy and other illegal drugs. He was the sponsor of the bipartisan Reducing Americans' Vulnerability to Ecstasy (RAVE) Act in 2002; the bill's successor, the Illicit Drug Anti-Proliferation Act, was later enacted as part of a broader 2003 crime bill that became law. The legislation, an expansion of the existing 1986 federal anti-"crack house" statute, provided for civil and criminal penalties for event promoters and property owners/managers who knowingly allowed their property to be used for sale or consumption of drugs. The legislation was opposed by the ACLU and electronic dance music enthusiasts who viewed it as overly broad. Responding to criticism, Biden said that the statute would not target law-abiding promoters, saying on the Senate floor: "The reason I introduced this bill was not to ban dancing, kill 'the rave scene' or silence electronic music—all things of which I have been accused. In no way is this bill aimed at stifling any type of music or expression. It is only trying to deter illicit drug use and protect kids." Although the law has been rarely used, advocates such as Drug Policy Alliance and DanceSafe argue that it discourages event producers from engaging in harm reduction efforts and have sought to clarify the law.

Biden opposed the legalization of marijuana as a young senator in 1974, in contrast to his other more liberal views. In 2010 he maintained this position, stating: "I still believe it's a gateway drug. I've spent a lot of my life as chairman of the Judiciary Committee dealing with this. I think it would be a mistake to legalize." In a 2014 interview, Biden said, "I think the idea of focusing significant resources on interdicting or convicting people for smoking marijuana is a waste of our resources" but said, "Our policy for our Administration is still not legalization." In 2019 and 2020, during his presidential campaign, Biden expressed support for decriminalizing marijuana and legalizing medical marijuana; reclassifying it as a Schedule II drug to ease marijuana research; automatically expunging prior convictions for marijuana convictions; and allowing states to legalize without federal interference. In October 2022, President Biden announced that all federal convictions for simple marijuana possession would be pardoned, while also announcing that he would initiate a review to determine how cannabis should be scheduled under federal law, adding that the Schedule I classification of cannabis "makes no sense".

As vice president, Biden actively engaged with Central American leaders on issues of drug cartels, drug trafficking, and migration to the U.S. caused by insecurity and drug violence. (See Central America below.)

=== Education ===
Biden was a major author of the Gun-Free School Zones Act of 1990 and voted in favor of the Improving America's Schools Act of 1994. He voted in favor of the 2001 No Child Left Behind Act, but in 2007 called for the legislation to be scrapped or overhauled. He supports class size reductions and investment in early childhood education. During his 2020 presidential campaign, Biden has proposed tripling Title I funds (which go to low-income schools) to pay for increases in student supports and teacher salaries; doubling the number of school guidance counselors, psychologists, social workers, and nurses; providing for universal prekindergarten, and fully funding the Individuals with Disabilities Education Act within a decade. Biden also supports federal infrastructure legislation providing funding for school buildings; allowing high school students to use Pell Grants for dual enrollment; and expanding career and technical education through school/community college/employer partnerships. Biden opposes federal funding for for-profit charter schools (which make up a small percentage of charter schools) and opposes "private school vouchers and other policies that divert taxpayer–funded resources away from the public school system." He supports allowing parents and students to choose between traditional public schools, magnet schools and "high-performing" charter schools.

Biden's plans have been praised by the National Education Association and American Federation of Teachers, the major U.S. teachers' unions, which both endorsed Biden in 2020. In April 2020, Biden proposed forgiving student debt from public colleges and universities and minority-serving institutions, for people earning up to $125,000 per year.

=== Gun control ===
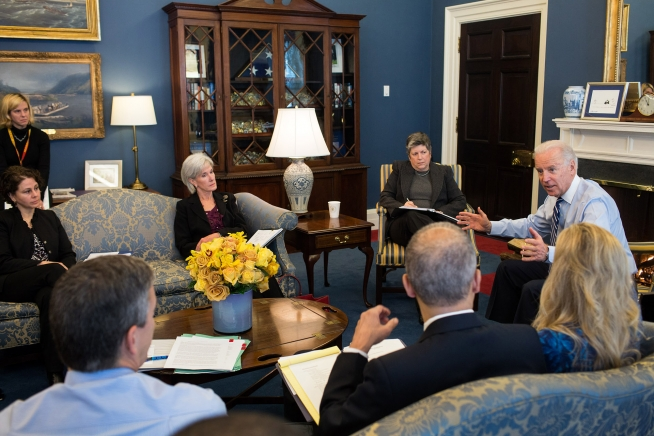
Vice President Biden discussing gun violence with advisors and officials in his West Wing office

Throughout his career, Biden has supported gun control measures. Although he voted for the 1986 Firearm Owners Protection Act, a bill supported by the National Rifle Association of America (NRA) that passed the Senate 79–15, Biden also authored the 1993 federal assault weapons ban, and is a longtime supporter of universal background checks, and received "F" ratings from the NRA while he was in Congress. The Brady Campaign to Prevent Gun Violence endorsed Biden's 2020 presidential campaign.

Biden supported the 1993 Brady Handgun Violence Prevention Act, which established five-day waiting periods for handgun purchases and background checks. He had a central role in the passage of the Federal Assault Weapons Ban of 1994, which banned the manufacture, transfer, or possession of certain firearms classified as assault weapons (with a grandfather clause excepting guns owned prior to its implementation). After the ban expired in 2004, Biden voted in favor of renewing it in a 2007 Senate vote. The Obama/Biden administration also unsuccessfully pressed for renewal of the ban. Biden voted against the Protection of Lawful Commerce in Arms Act (PLCAA) of 2005, which immunizes firearm manufacturers from lawsuits based on gun violence.

After the Sandy Hook Elementary School massacre in 2012, Obama named Biden to lead a task force on gun violence and community safety. Biden and the administration proposed universal background checks (with an exception for gun transfers between family members), resumption of public health research on gun violence, and reinstatement of the federal assault weapons ban. Proposals requiring legislative action were killed in the Republican-controlled Congress amid opposition from the NRA. During his 2020 presidential campaign, Biden's proposals on gun violence include universal background checks for gun sales, repeal of PLCAA, reinstatement of the assault weapons ban and a ban on high-capacity magazines, and incentives for states to adopt red flag laws.

Biden owns two shotguns.

=== Homeland security ===
After the 1995 Oklahoma City bombing on April 19, 1995, a domestic terrorist attack, Biden drafted anti-terrorist legislation, which was ultimately defeated. He later claimed publicly on several occasions that the USA PATRIOT Act, which eased restrictions on the Executive branch in the surveillance and detention of those suspected of terrorism or facilitating it, was essentially a duplicate of the anti-terrorist legislation he had drafted years earlier. Biden supported the PATRIOT Act but voted to limit wiretapping on the bill. He supports implementing the 9/11 Commission's recommendations to fight terrorists but voted to preserve habeas corpus rights to the alleged terror suspects serving in Guantanamo Bay. In the 1990s, he voted in favor of 36 vetoed military projects and supports efforts to prevent nuclear proliferation. He was given a 60% approval rating from the American Civil Liberties Union (ACLU) reflecting a mixed voting record on civil rights issues. During a debate on November 15, 2007, Biden clarified the PATRIOT Act's effect, his continued support for it, and his opposition to racial profiling.

On the war on terror, Biden voted in favor of the USA PATRIOT Act of 2001.

=== Immigration ===
==== Senate ====
While in the Senate, Biden voted in favor of the 1986 immigration bill (which passed) and the 2007 comprehensive immigration reform bill (which failed). In a 2007 Democratic presidential primary debate, Biden said that it would be impractical and expensive to deport every unauthorized immigrant in the U.S. and proposed an earned path to citizenship, saying: "Get a background check on all of them, take out the criminals, get them back, and provide for a means by which we allow earned citizenship over the next decade or so. Folks, being commander in chief requires you to occasionally be practical." Biden voted for the Secure Fence Act of 2006, which authorized and partially funded the construction of fencing along the Mexican border, mostly as a means to combat cross-border drug trafficking. During the same campaign, Biden said that would not allow sanctuary cities to ignore federal law. In 2007, Biden said that illegal immigration would not stop unless U.S. employers stopped hiring undocumented workers, saying: "All the rest is window dressing."

==== Vice presidency ====
As vice president, Biden supported the 2013 bipartisan comprehensive immigration reform bill, a bill crafted by the Gang of Eight (four Democratic, four Republican senators) that would have created a 13-year pathway to citizenship for unauthorized immigrants with security checks, devoted unprecedented resources to border security, created a new work visa program, and established a mandatory employment verification system to ensure that persons hired are authorized to work in the U.S. As president of the Senate, Biden personally presided over the Senate when the bill passed 68–32. The legislation failed, however, in the Republican-controlled House of Representatives.

In 2015, Biden spoke at a White House summit for "Countering Violent Extremism." In it, he spoke about how Americans of European descent were predicted to soon become a minority in the United States by stating "fewer than 50 percent of the people in America ... will be white European stock," as well as opining that such a fact is "not a bad thing."

==== 2020 proposals ====
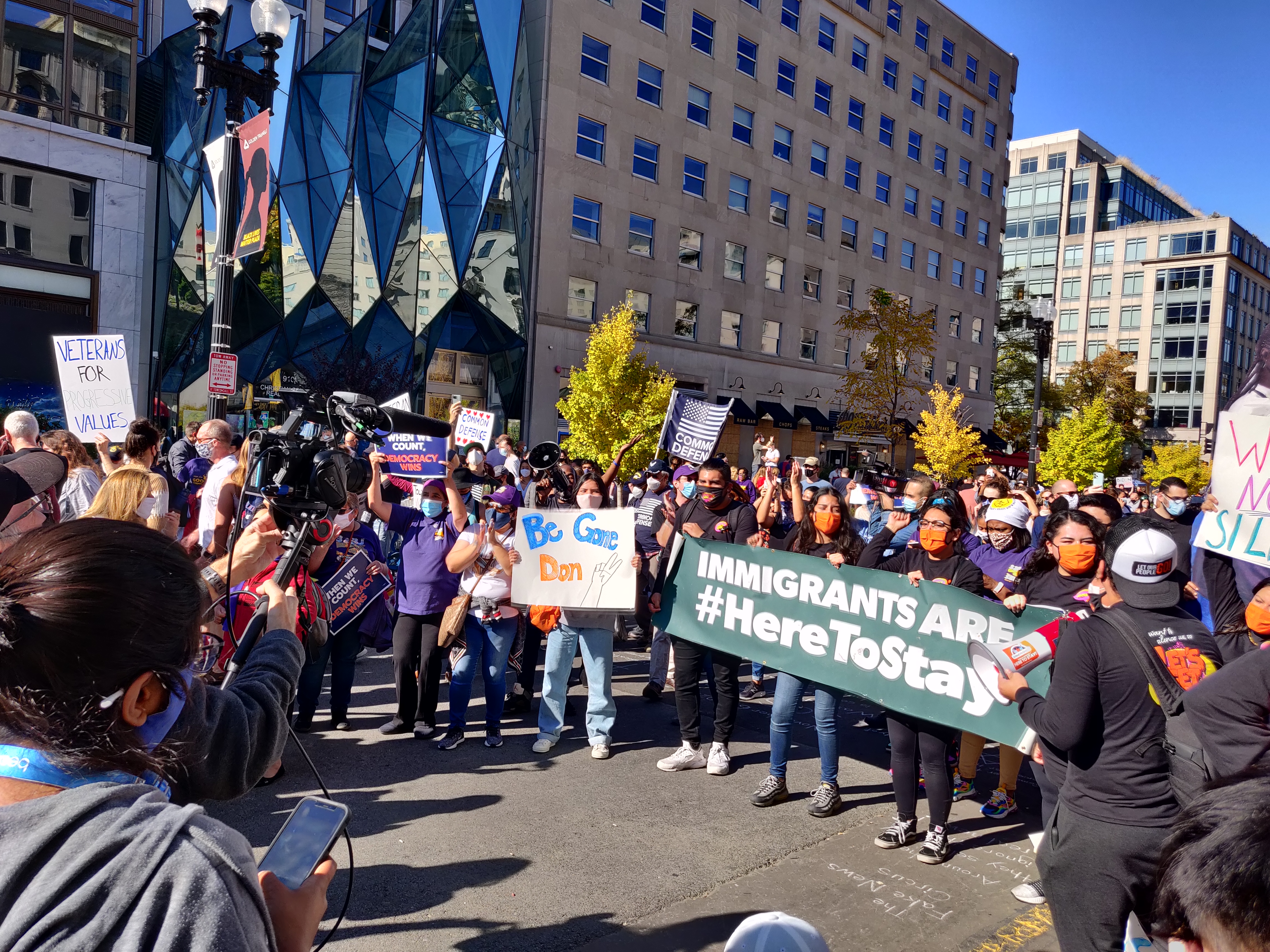
A group of immigrants celebrates Biden's election victory in Washington, D.C.

During his 2020 presidential campaign, Biden issued his "Biden Plan for Securing Our Values as a Nation of Immigrants," in which he pledged to "secure our border, while ensuring the dignity of migrants and upholding their legal right to seek asylum. ... enforce our laws without targeting communities, violating due process, or tearing apart families," "ensure our values are squarely at the center of our immigration and enforcement policies," and create a "fair and humane immigration system." Biden's proposals would undo Trump's immigration policies, which Biden has criticized as immoral, inhumane, ineffective, economically damaging, and unconstitutional. Biden said he would raise the annual ceiling for refugees from 15,000 (the historically low level set under the Trump administration) to 125,000 (higher than the Obama-era ceiling). He pledged a reversal of the Trump administration's family separation policy, travel/refugee bans, and severe restrictions on asylum, calling these policies "cruel and senseless" and "un-American." If elected, he pledges to reverse Trump's public charge rule and "so-called National Emergency," which diverted money from the Defense Department to construct a wall on the U.S.-Mexico border. Biden criticized Trump's promotion of a border wall, noting that smuggling through legal ports of entry, rather than simple illicit border-crossing, is the dominant method by which illicit drugs enter the U.S., and that "sophisticated criminal organizations" can easily circumvent physical barriers through "border tunnels, semi-submersible vessels, and aerial technology." Biden has called for better security along the border and at ports of entry through technology and infrastructure (such as "cameras, sensors, large-scale x-ray machines, and fixed towers") as well as through improved coordination between federal agencies, as well as Mexican and Canadian authorities.

During his 2020 campaign, Biden proposed a "surge" of humanitarian resources to the border and restoration of the Deferred Action for Childhood Arrivals (DACA) program for undocumented youth raised in the United States (the "Dreamers"). As a longer-term goal, Biden said he supported a path to citizenship for undocumented immigrants currently in the United States. Biden also pledged to create a program to allow U.S. military veterans deported by the Trump Administration to return to the United States. He supports evidence-based alternatives to prolonged immigration detention, and a ban on for-profit detention centers. Biden does not support abolition of U.S. Immigration and Customs Enforcement (ICE), as some on the left-wing have called for, but said that his administration would ensure that ICE and U.S. Customs and Border Protection officers "abide by professional standards and are held accountable for inhumane treatment." Biden does not support the decriminalization of unauthorized border-crossing, but pledged to restore "sensible enforcement priorities" that focus deportation and other enforcement efforts on persons convicted of serious crimes. rather than people "who have lived, worked, and contributed to our economy and our communities for decades." To address a backlog in the immigration courts, Biden proposed a doubling of the number of immigration judges and interpreters. Biden also opposes Trump's attempts to withhold federal grant funding from sanctuary cities.

Regarding migrant crises, Biden's 2020 immigration policy emphasized a need to address the root causes of migration from the Central America's Northern Triangle of El Salvador, Guatemala, and Honduras, such as endemic instability, corruption, gang violence and gender-based violence, and a lack of the rule of law. Biden pledged to update the Central American Minors Program and advance humanitarian aid, stability, and economic development in the region. He also stated that he would use the Temporary Protected Status program for persons whose countries of origin suffer from violence or unsafe conditions.

=== Internet privacy and file sharing ===
In 2006, in its Technology Issues Voter's Guide, CNET.com gave Biden a score of 37.5% on his Senate voting record. Biden was a co-sponsor of the Platform Equality and Remedies for Rights Holders in Music Act of 2007.

Biden also sponsored two bills, the Comprehensive Counter-Terrorism Act (SB 266) and the Violent Crime Control Act (SB 618), both of which contained language seen as effectively banning encryption. Crypto notes Biden wrote that language into the text of SB 266. Phil Zimmermann, the creator of Pretty Good Privacy, has said it was SB 266 that "led [him] to publish PGP electronically for free that year, shortly before the measure was defeated after vigorous protest by civil libertarians and industry groups." He later stated in a Slashdot article that he was not specifically criticizing Biden, that he would consider the Senator's "whole body of work" when considering whether to vote for him on the Democratic ticket in 2008 and that "considering the disastrous erosion in our privacy and civil liberties under the (Bush) administration, I feel positively nostalgic about Biden's quaint little non-binding resolution of 1991".

=== LGBTQ issues ===
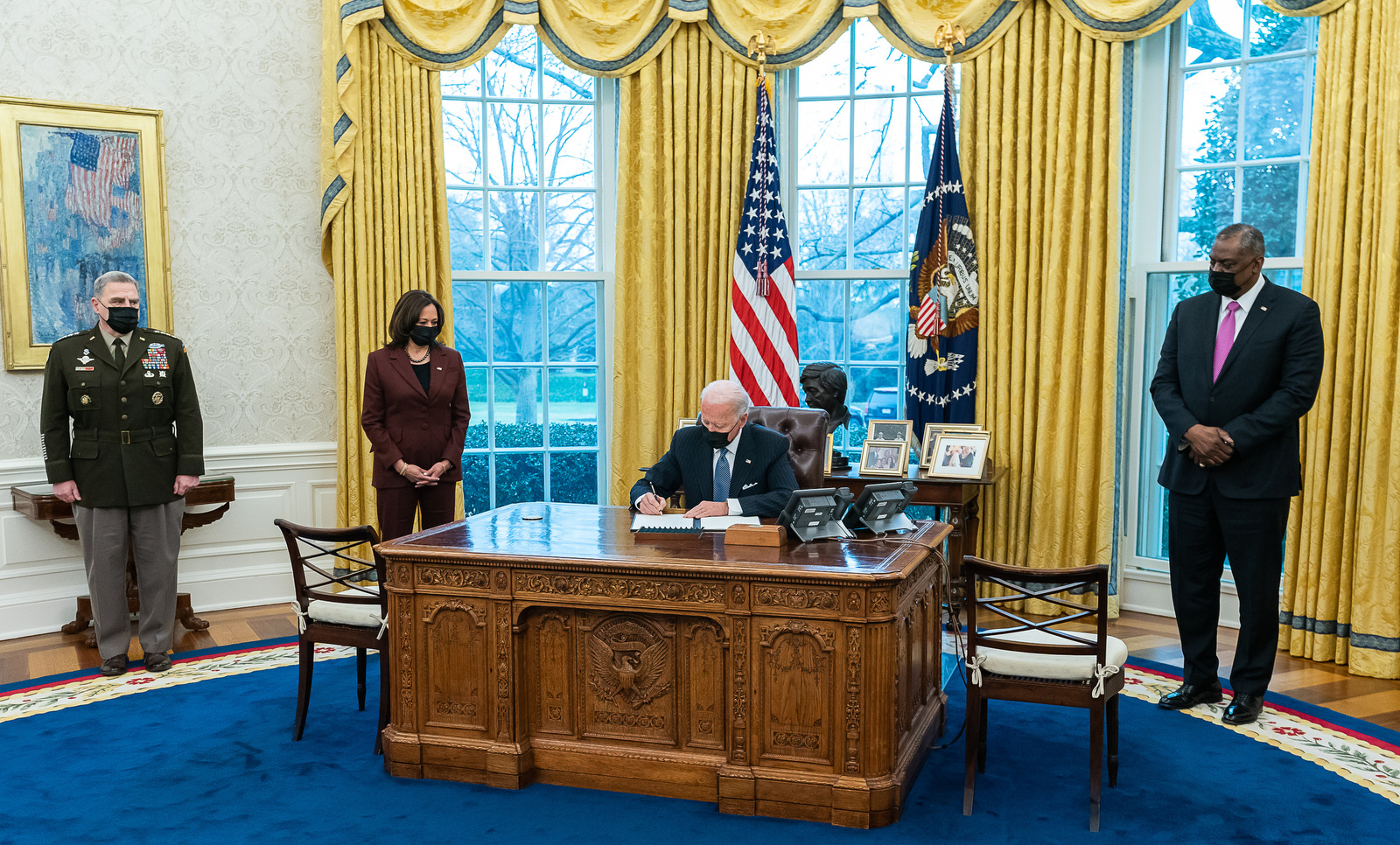
President Biden signs an executive order overturning the transgender military ban imposed by the Trump administration.

Vice President Biden expresses support for bullied LGBT young people in a video recorded for the It Gets Better Project (transcript).

While in the Senate, Biden voted in 1993 for a broad defense bill that included the "don't ask, don't tell" law on LGBT service in the U.S. military, after voting to remove the amendment. As vice president, Biden supported the Don't Ask, Don't Tell Repeal Act of 2010, which repealed the prohibition on open service by gay, lesbian, and bisexual people in the U.S. military.

In 1996, Biden voted in favor of the Defense of Marriage Act which prohibited the federal government from recognizing any same-sex marriage, barring individuals in such marriages from equal protection under federal law, and allowing states to do the same. In the Senate, Biden was an outspoken critic of congressional Republicans' efforts in the 2000s to adopt a constitutional amendment to prohibit same-sex marriage; in arguing against the proposal in 2004, Biden cited his position that same-sex marriage was an issue for states to decide. During the lead up to the 2008 US presidential election he said "In an Obama-Biden administration, there will be absolutely no distinction from a constitutional standpoint or a legal standpoint between a same-sex and a heterosexual couple" and that they both opposed "redefining from a civil side what constitutes marriage".

In a May 2012 Meet the Press interview, Vice President Biden reversed his previous position and publicly supported same-sex marriage, saying he was "absolutely comfortable with the fact that men marrying men, women marrying women, and heterosexual men and women marrying another are entitled to the same exact rights, all the civil rights, all the civil liberties. And quite frankly, I don't see much of a distinction beyond that." Prior to Biden's statement on Meet the Press, the Obama administration endorsed civil unions, but not same-sex marriage. Biden's decision reportedly forced Obama's hand, pressuring Obama to accelerate his own public shift to support same-sex marriage. In 2013, Section 3 of DOMA was ruled unconstitutional and partially struck down in United States v. Windsor. The Obama Administration did not defend the law and congratulated Windsor.

Biden supported the U.S. Supreme Court's 5–4 ruling in Obergefell v. Hodges (2015), which held that same-sex couples have a federal constitutional right to marry and shortly after he officiated a gay wedding Biden issued a statement saying that the ruling reflected a principle that "all people should be treated with respect and dignity – and that all marriages, at their root, are defined by unconditional love." In an event with the group Freedom to Marry, Biden described the decision as "the civil rights movement of our generation" and as consequential as Brown v. Board of Education. Jim Obergefell, the lead plaintiff in the case, endorsed Biden's 2020 presidential run, as did other LGBT leaders.

Biden supports the Equality Act, proposed federal legislation that would extend the nondiscrimination protections of the Civil Rights Act of 1964 to cover discrimination "on the basis of sex, sexual orientation, gender identity, or pregnancy, childbirth, or a related medical condition of an individual, as well as because of sex-based stereotypes." The legislation would protect LGBTQ Americans from discrimination across the country in housing, public accommodations, public education, credit, and the jury system, in addition to current federal employment protections.

During his 2020 presidential campaign, Biden vowed to support legislation and action to prohibit discrimination against transgender people and to combat hate crimes targeting LGBT persons, including violence and harassment against transgender people. However, his administration proposed a regulation to allow schools to bar transgender athletes from competitive teams, a decision which was strongly opposed by transgender advocates. He has criticized Republicans, and particularly Vice President Mike Pence, for using "religious freedom as an excuse to license discrimination." He supports the Safe Schools Improvement Act, a proposed anti-bullying law.

=== Religious faith ===
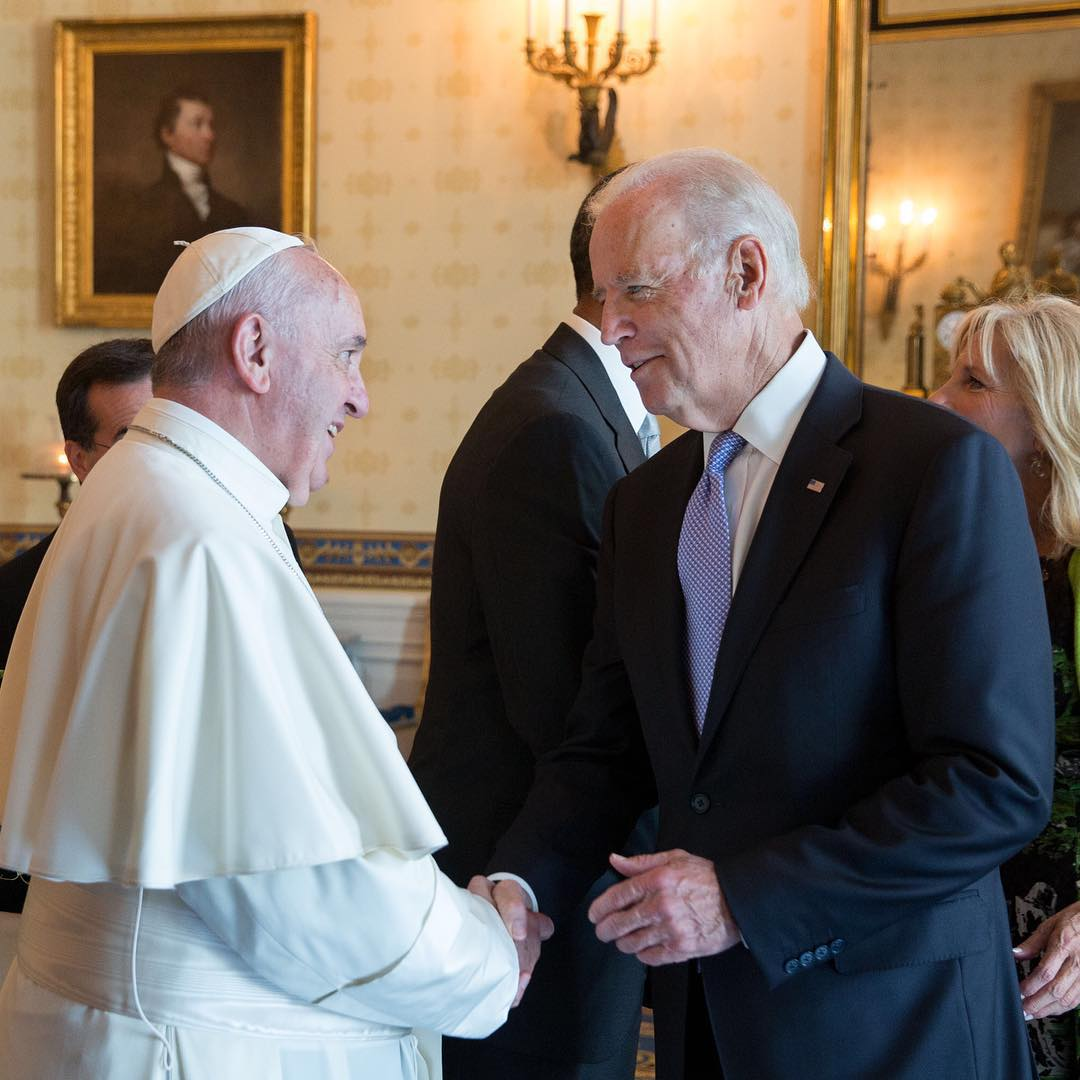
Biden meets Pope Francis at the White House.

Biden has mentioned Catholic social teaching as an influence on his personal political beliefs.

At a November 2011 campaign event, in response to a question about how Biden viewed Mitt Romney's Mormon faith in November 2011, Biden said, "I find it preposterous that in 2011 we're debating whether or not a man is qualified or worthy of your vote based on whether or not his religion ... is a disqualifying provision. It is not. It is embarrassing and we should be ashamed, anyone who thinks that way." Biden cited the anti-Catholic prejudice encountered by John F. Kennedy in the 1960 presidential election.

=== Women's rights ===
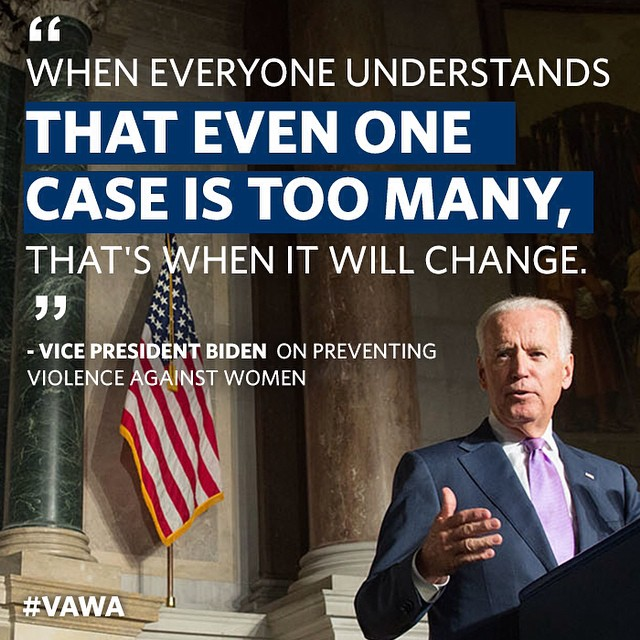
A quote on violence against women posted to then-Vice President Biden's Instagram account

In 1991, Biden was chairman of the Senate Judiciary Committee when it held confirmation hearings on Republican president George H. W. Bush's nomination of Judge Clarence Thomas to the Supreme Court. During the nomination process, Thomas was accused of a consistent pattern of sexual harassment, to which Anita Hill testified before the committee. During the hearing, Biden referred to an inconclusive FBI report on the accusations by Hill as "he said, she said." Biden refused to call other women who were willing to testify against Thomas as corroborating witnesses. He voted against Thomas's confirmation both in the committee and on the Senate floor. In 2017, Biden apologized to Hill over her treatment in the hearings, stating: "Let's get something straight here, I believed Anita Hill. I voted against Clarence Thomas... I am so sorry that she had to go through what she went through. Think of the courage that it took for her to come forward." Speaking in 2018, Biden expressed regret about not being more firm in preventing Senate colleagues on the committee from engaging in what he called "character assassination" of Hill, saying: "Anita Hill was vilified when she came forward, by a lot of my colleagues, I wish I could have done more to prevent those questions and the way they asked them....Under the Senate rules, I can't gavel you down and say you can't ask that question, although I tried. And so what happened was she got victimized again during the process."

In 1994, Biden drafted the Violence Against Women Act; some suggest this was drafted in light of criticism Biden had received following the treatment of Anita Hill. This law provided $1.6 billion to enhance investigation and prosecution of the violent crime perpetrated against women, increased pre-trial detention of the accused, provided for automatic and mandatory restitution of those convicted, and allowed civil redress in cases prosecutors chose to leave unprosecuted.

The U.S. Supreme Court struck down portions of the VAWA on Constitutional grounds in United States v. Morrison.

Biden has said, "I consider the Violence Against Women Act the single most significant legislation that I've crafted during my 35-year tenure in the Senate. Indeed, the enactment of the Violence Against Women Act in 1994 was the beginning of a historic commitment to women and children victimized by domestic violence and sexual assault. Our nation has been rewarded for this commitment. Since the Act's passage in 1994, domestic violence has dropped by almost 50%." He has also said that the Act "empower[s] women to make changes in their lives, and by training police and prosecutors to arrest and convict abusive husbands instead of telling them to take a walk around the block".

== Economic issues ==
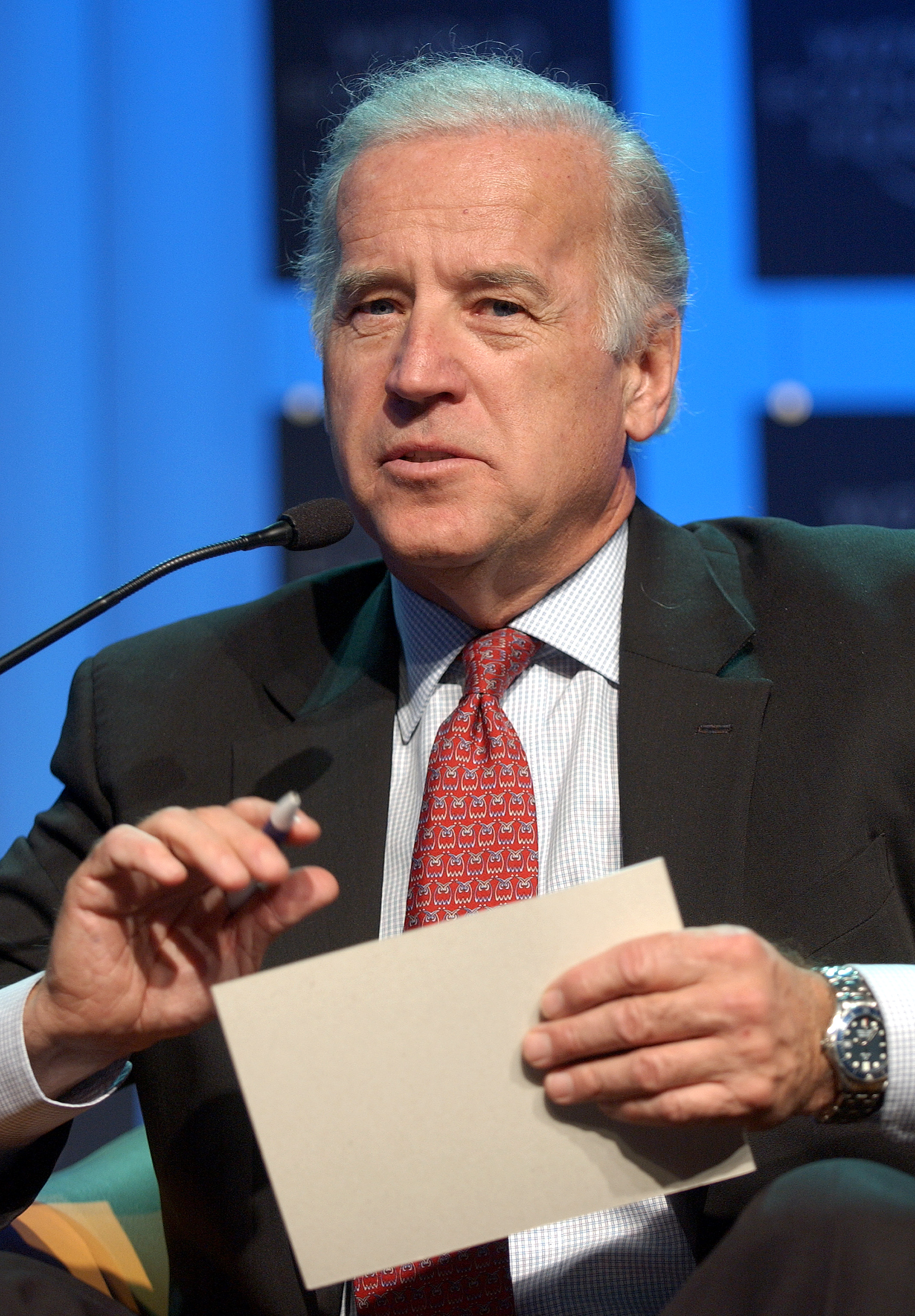
Biden at the World Economic Forum in Davos, Switzerland

=== Agriculture and rural issues ===
Biden supported the 2008 farm bill, calling it a "responsible compromise." When he chaired the Senate Foreign Relations Committee, Biden identified agricultural development and global food prices as major issues.

While in the Senate, Biden called for strong action against invasive species, citing the economic and environmental risks associated with them, including displacement of native shipping, the introduction of disease, and interference with shipping.

In the Senate, Biden paid particular attention to issues affecting the poultry industry, which is economically important to Delaware, especially in the Delmarva peninsula. In the 1990s, Biden criticized the Russian government for threatening to ban imported U.S. chicken, and in 2008 criticized the Russian government for banning imports of chicken from 19 poultry processing plants in the United States, Biden stated that "Russia is once again using non-tariff barriers as an excuse to close its markets to American poultry. ... Russia has repeatedly shown that it is not ready to abide by the rules of international trade." Biden described the Russian action as "part of a bigger picture in which Russia has failed to behave as a responsible member in the international community" and called for the U.S. to block Russia's application to join the World Trade Organization. Biden also worked to promote funding to research avian influenza.

During his 2020 presidential campaign, Biden has outlined a rural and agricultural policy broadly similar to that of the Obama administration. The plan aims to obtain net zero emissions for agriculture (making the U.S. the first nation to do so) via incentives and permitting farmers to join carbon markets. The plan also calls for changes in trade policy to encourage U.S. agriculture exports; expansion of broadband Internet in rural areas; renewable energy investment; promotion of local and regional food; and an expansion of the USDA Conservation Stewardship Program to encourage farmers to adopt carbon sequestration and other environmental practices.

=== Banking and financial regulation ===
In 1999, Biden voted in favor the Gramm–Leach–Bliley Act which partially repealed Glass–Steagall legislation.

During the 2000s, Biden sponsored bankruptcy legislation, which was sought by MBNA, one of Delaware's largest companies and Biden's largest contributor in the late 1990s, and other credit card issuers. He fought for certain amendments to the bill that would indirectly protect homeowners and forbid felons from using bankruptcy to discharge fines. He also worked to defeat amendments which would have protected members of the military and those who are pushed into bankruptcy by medical debt. Critics expressed concern that the law would force those seeking bankruptcy protection to hire lawyers to process the required paperwork, making it more difficult for students to execute education-related debt. The overall bill was vetoed by President Bill Clinton in 2000, but then finally passed as the Bankruptcy Abuse Prevention and Consumer Protection Act in 2005, with Biden supporting it. During his 2020 presidential campaign, Biden moved to the left on the issue, endorsing Senator Elizabeth Warren's bankruptcy reform proposal, which would roll back many aspects of the 2005 law.

During and after the Obama/Biden administration, Biden strongly supported the Dodd–Frank Wall Street Reform and Consumer Protection Act. The Dodd-Frank Act implemented new financial regulations designed to prevent a reprise of the 2008 financial crisis. The Act also created the Consumer Financial Protection Bureau. He also supported the pro-consumer Credit Card Accountability, Responsibility and Disclosure Act.

=== Environment and climate change ===
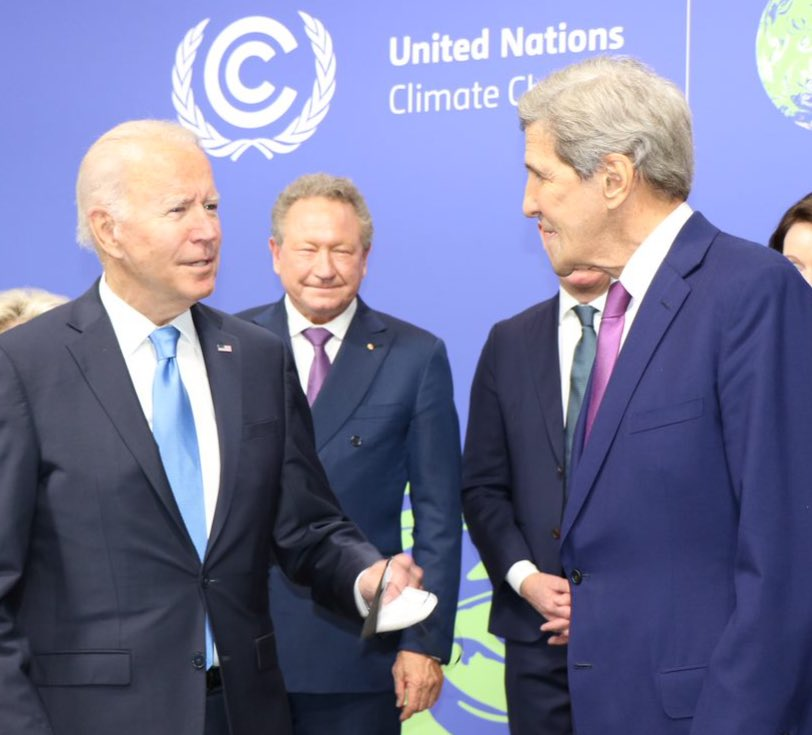
Biden and John Kerry, the U.S. Special Presidential Envoy for Climate, at the COP26 climate summit in Glasgow, Scotland on November 2, 2021

Biden has been credited with introducing the first climate change bill in Congress. Biden's initial bill, the Global Climate Protection Act, was introduced in 1986; it died in the Senate, but a version was included in a bill signed into law by President Reagan as an amendment to the Foreign Relations Authorization Act in December 1987.

In 2008, Biden was the lead sponsor of a "Sense of the Senate" resolution calling on the U.S. to be a part of the United Nations climate change negotiations and was a co-sponsor of the Boxer-Sanders Global Warming Pollution Reduction Act, at the time the most stringent climate bill in the Senate. The legislation would have created a cap-and-trade system for greenhouse-gas emissions and required a reduction in U.S. emissions to 1990 levels by 2020, and to 80% below 1990 levels by 2050. He strongly opposed opening the Arctic National Wildlife Refuge to oil drilling, although when he became president, he only called for a temporary moratorium instead. In 2007–2008, during his presidential campaign, Biden called for a gradual increase in automobile fuel-economy standards to 40 miles per gallon by 2017, called for increase production of renewable energy, and identified energy security and resolving the energy crisis as key priorities.

In June 2019, Biden's presidential campaign unveiled a $1.7 trillion climate policy plan aiming to eliminate U.S. net greenhouse gas emissions by 2050. The proposal incorporated elements of the Green New Deal proposal but lacked many key aspects, such as less funding, no healthcare expansion, no guaranteed jobs or benefits, less guaranteed housing, and no bans on fracking. Biden's plan would eliminate fossil fuel subsidies; halt issuance of new permits for oil and gas extraction on public land and water; step up Clean Air Act enforcement; strengthen fuel economy standards to promote a shift to electric vehicles; regulate methane pollution; and create "aggressive" energy efficiency standards for appliances and buildings. Biden also promised that he would re-enter the Paris Agreement (from which Trump pulled the U.S.) on his first day in the White House and called for "a major diplomatic push to raise the ambitions of countries' climate targets." To pressure countries failing to meet their climate obligations, Biden also called for "carbon adjustment fees" to be levied on goods imported from countries that failed to meet emissions targets. The plan also won considerable support from the fossil fuel industry.

Biden's Green New Deal plan is incorporated in his American Jobs Plan and American Families Plan, which would in part lead to the creation of a Civilian Climate Corps modeled after the Civilian Conservation Corps. In November 2021, Biden promised to end and reverse deforestation and land degradation by 2030, in the COP26 climate summit's first major agreement.

A week after the November closing of COP26 the Biden administration held the largest federal gas and oil lease auction in U.S. history, selling 1.7 million acres in the Gulf of Mexico. The areas can be expected to produce around 4.2 trillion cubic feet of natural gas and 1.12 billion barrels of oil over the next 50 years. In January 2021, the administration put a pause on new federal gas and oil leasing but was sued to open them for sale by several Republican-led states. When a federal judge sided with the states Biden appealed the decision but agreed to continue with the sales. The administration has also proposed another round of gas and oil lease sales in 2022, in Colorado, Montana, Wyoming, and other western states.

In 2022, Biden signed the Inflation Reduction Act into law, which represents the largest investment into addressing climate change in United States history.

=== Transportation ===
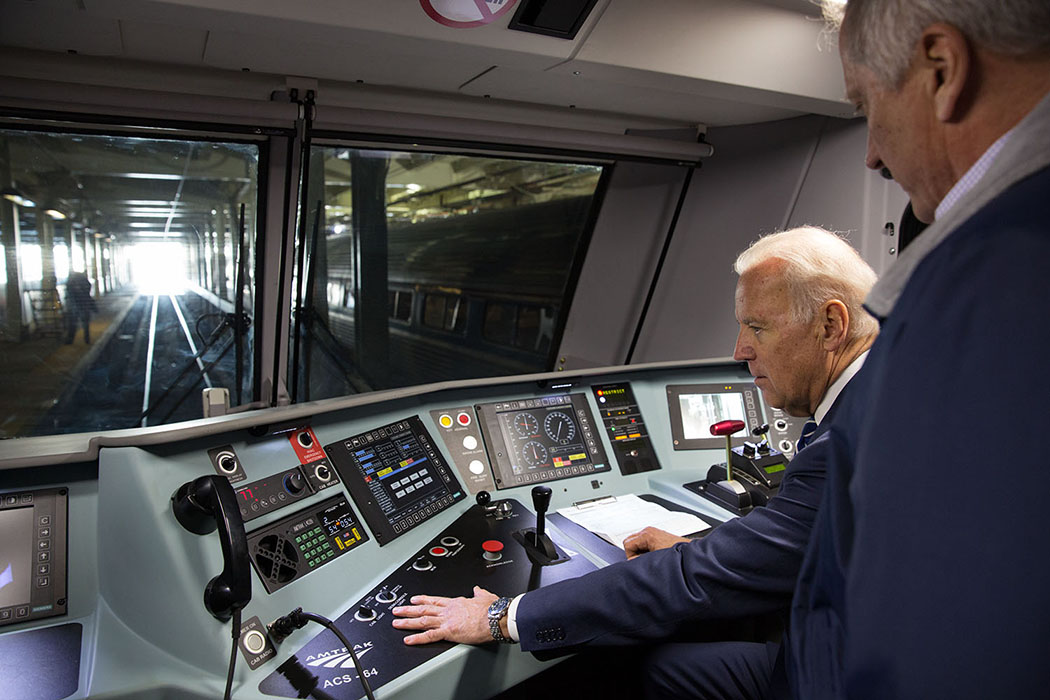
Biden at the controls of an Amtrak Cities Sprinter

During the Obama administration, Biden was the lead figure promoting the administration's proposal to spend $53 billion over six years toward construction of a national intercity high-speed rail network, in furtherance of Obama's goal (outlined in the 2011 State of the Union Address) to extend high-speed rail access to 80% of the American population over a quarter-century. Republicans in Congress rejected the proposal, which did not advance.

During his 2020 presidential campaign, Biden released a $1.3 trillion infrastructure improvement plan, which would follow up on Obama administration priorities. The plan calls for $50 billion investment in repairs to existing roads and bridges in his first year in office; $10 billion over a decade to transit construction in high-poverty parts of the U.S.; doubling funding for BUILD and INFRA grants, and more funds for the U.S. Army Corps of Engineers. The plan also includes proposals for investments in high-speed rail, public transit, and bicycling, as well as school construction, replacement of water pipes and other water infrastructure, and expansion of rural broadband. The plan also specifically calls for the rebuilding of the Hudson River Tunnel and the expansion of the Northeast Corridor, as well as rail investments in California and the Midwest and West. Biden proposed funding the plan through tax increases on high-income Americans and corporations; the campaign stated that "reversing the excesses of the Trump tax cuts for corporations; reducing incentives for tax havens, evasion, and outsourcing; ensuring corporations pay their fair share; closing other loopholes in our tax code that reward wealth, not work; and ending subsidies for fossil fuels" would provide the revenue for the plan, making it deficit-neutral.

A long-term rider and advocate of Amtrak, during his 2020 campaign, Biden said that, if elected, his administration would "spark the second great railroad revolution" and move to electrify Amtrak trains. He also voiced support for 2,000 Amtrak workers furloughed due to Trump administration budget cuts, although he did not take a specific position on Amtrak personnel and service reductions.

=== Trade policy ===
In the Senate, Biden consistently supported "a U.S.-led, rules-based international order with an emphasis on reducing trade barriers and setting global trade standards." He had a mixed record on specific free trade agreements; he voted in favor of the North American Free Trade Agreement (NAFTA), Australia-U.S. Free Trade Agreement, and Morocco–U.S. Free Trade Agreement, but voted against free-trade agreements with Singapore, Chile, Oman, and the Dominican Republic and Central America (CAFTA), viewing their labor and environmental protections as insufficient. He voted in favor of fast track trade promotion authority in 1998 and in favor of permanent normal trade relations with China in 2000. During the Obama administration, Biden was a strong advocate for the Trans-Pacific Partnership, arguing that the U.S. withdrawal from the TPP "put China in the driver's seat" by allowing it to "write the rules of the road for the world" in the absence of U.S. participation.

Biden has been critical of Chinese trade tactics, including "dumping" of steel and Chinese theft of U.S. intellectual property. He believes the US, rather than China, should write the rules that govern trade, in which "workers, the environment, transparency, and middle-class wages" are protected. He has criticized the Trump trade war with China for failing to "resolve the issues at the heart of the dispute"; for the trade war's negative effect on U.S. agriculture and manufacturing; and for Trump's unilateral approach. Biden also criticized Trump for labeling Canada and the European Union as "national security threats," arguing that this undercuts multilateral efforts with allies to combat Chinese trade abuses. He supports pressuring China on environmental issues and supports the United States–Mexico–Canada Agreement.

=== Healthcare ===
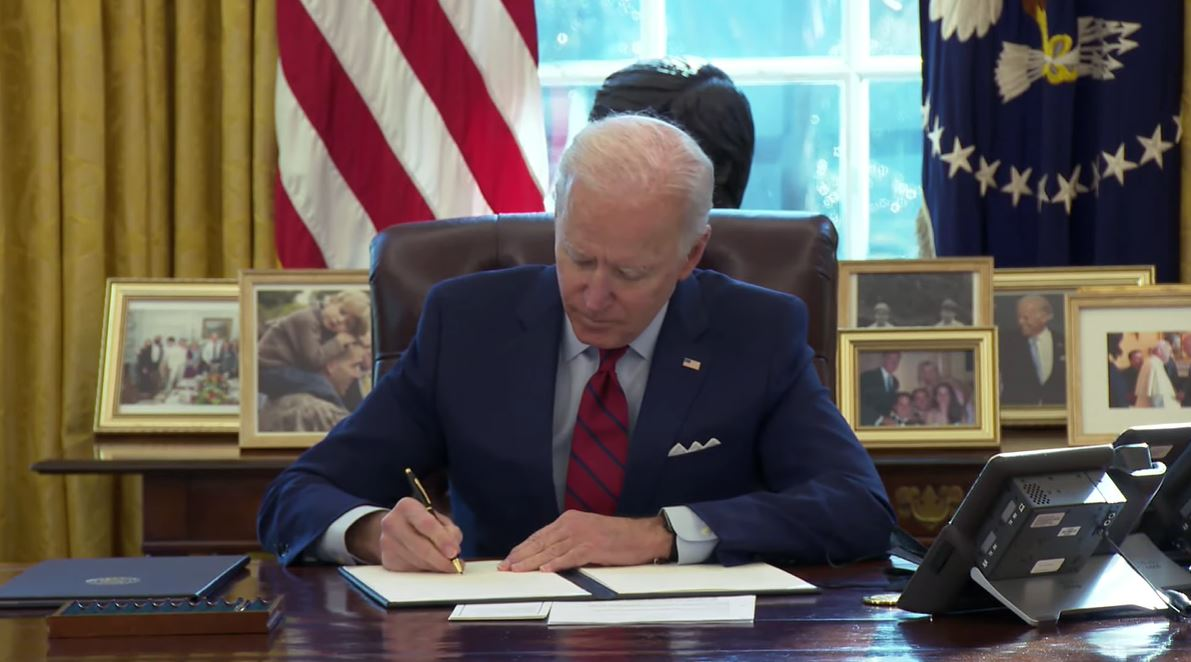
Biden signs an executive order related to the Affordable Care Act and Medicaid.

Biden is a staunch supporter of the Affordable Care Act (ACA), the Obama administration's signature health care reform legislation. He has condemned the Trump administration's attempts to strike down the ACA in court, including in California v. Texas. Biden supports the ACA's protections for Americans with pre-existing conditions as well as the ACA's minimum standards for health insurance plans; he has pledged to preserve these protections.

During his 2020 presidential campaign, Biden has promoted a plan to expand and build upon the ACA, paid for by revenue gained from reversing some Trump administration tax cuts. Biden's plan is to create a public option for health insurance, with the aim of expanding health insurance coverage to 97% of Americans. He does not support single-payer health care proposals such as Medicare for All. Under Biden's proposal, "no one would be required to pay more than 8.5 percent of their income toward health insurance premiums."

Under Biden's plan, all those on the individual insurance market would qualify for tax credits on premiums (a change from existing law, which caps premium tax credits at four times the federal poverty level, or under $50,000 for an independent). To reduce prescription drug prices, Biden proposes allowing import of prescription drugs and authorizing Medicare to directly negotiate drug prices. In April 2020, Biden proposed lowering the eligibility age for Medicare from 65 to 60.

Biden supports an end to surprise billing.

=== Labor unions ===
Biden expresses support for unionization of Amazon workers in Alabama, saying employers should use "no intimidation, no coercion, no threats, no anti-union propaganda."

Biden was given an 85% lifetime approval rating from AFL–CIO. and was a cosponsor of the Employee Free Choice Act.

As stated during his 2020 presidential campaign, the Biden administration intended to fight laws "that exist only to deprive unions of the financial support they need to fight for higher wages and better benefits" and sought to end or curtail the enforcement of the so-called 2020 Trump Rule which was the Department of Labor's (DOL) heightened oversight of union financial disclosure requirements. The so-called "Trump Rule" still exists, the Biden administration announced on March 29 that it will not be enforcing the heightened union reporting requirements to the DOL concerning strike funds, apprenticeship programs, and other union-related “trust fund” information.

While he describes himself as pro-labor, Biden has also supported legislation that would impose unpopular contracts on workers, forcing them to work without sick leave and using the Railway Labor Act to prevent workers from striking. Worker unions have voted against the proposal, citing quality of life concerns. In particular, it would penalize employees for medical visits, a policy that has been blamed for worker deaths and was a major issue during the COVID-19 pandemic. Railroad companies have seen sizeable profits under this policy and have been unwilling to negotiate, praising Biden for his proposed government intervention, which would compel workers to accept their terms.

=== Tax ===
Biden opposed the George W. Bush administration's tax cuts enacted mostly in 2001 and 2003, noting that most of the benefits of the tax cuts went to the very wealthiest U.S. families, and arguing that the cuts did not help working-class and middle-class Americans. The Obama/Biden administration advocated keeping the cuts in place for 98% of U.S. taxpayers but letting them expire on income over $250,000 earned by couples (or income over $200,000 for individuals).

After the Republicans took control of Congress in the 2010 election, Biden was designated as the administration's chief negotiator with congressional Republicans—specifically, Senate Majority Leader Mitch McConnell—regarding the Bush tax cuts, which were about to expire. The administration opposed extending Bush tax cuts for the wealthy but also did not want to trigger tax increases for non-wealthy Americans when the economy was continuing to recover from the Great Recession. The result was a deal: "Biden and McConnell hashed out a deal that extended all the Bush tax cuts until after the 2012 election, while injecting another $300 billion as an economic stimulus, including a new payroll tax cut for workers, extended unemployment benefits for victims of the recession and expanded tax credits for college students and the poor. By reopening the Senate, the deal also enabled the historic vote to repeal the ban on gay people in the military."

=== Social Security ===
Biden opposes privatizing or means-testing of Social Security. He was given an 89% approval rating from the Alliance for Retired Americans (ARA), reflecting a pro-senior citizen voting record. Biden has called for an expansion of Social Security, including by increasing payments to the oldest Americans (persons who have been receiving retirement benefits for at least 20 years); setting a minimum guaranteed benefit (equal to at least 125% of the federal poverty level) for all Americans with at least 30 years of work; and increasing monthly survivor benefits for widows and widowers by about 20%. Biden has proposed to fund the expansion, and to make the Social Security Trust Fund solvent over the long-term, through tax increases on the highest income-earners. Biden has condemned Trump for waging "a reckless war on Social Security" by signing an executive order in 2020 that deferred the collection of the payroll tax that funds Social Security, and for Trump's comments suggesting that he might seek to forgo the tax. Biden said that Trump's move will "undermine the entire financial footing of Social Security."

=== Welfare ===
Biden voted for the 1996 bipartisan welfare reform compromise legislation.

=== COVID-19 response plan ===
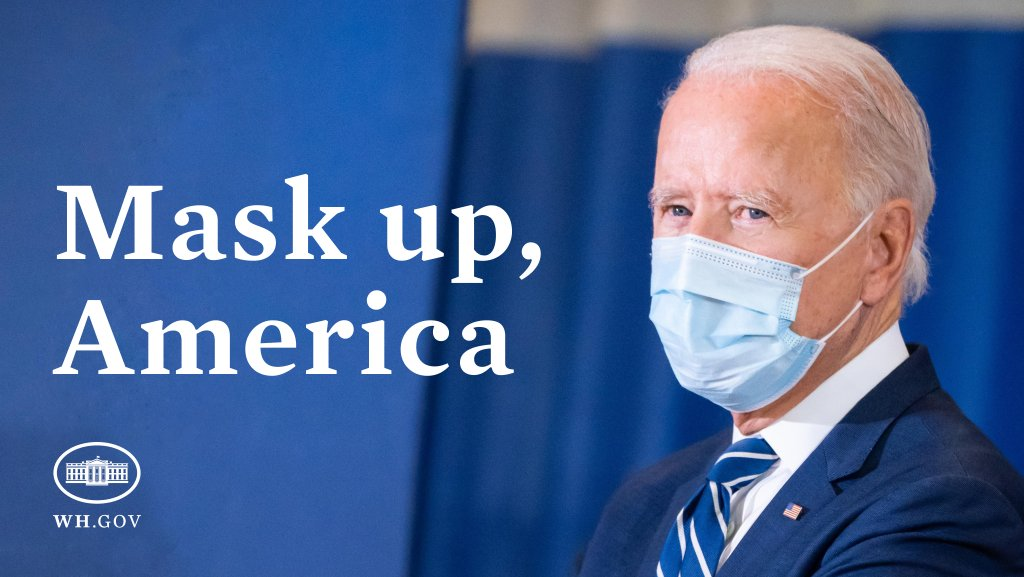
Social media image announcing Biden's face-mask mandate on federal property

Biden pledged a large federal government response to the novel coronavirus (COVID-19) pandemic akin to the New Deal of Franklin D. Roosevelt following the Great Depression. This would include increased COVID-19 testing, ensuring a steady supply of personal protective equipment, distributing a vaccine once available, and securing money from Congress for schools and hospitals under the aegis of a national "supply chain commander" who would coordinate the logistics of manufacturing and distributing protective gear and test kits, distributed by a "Pandemic Testing Board" (similar to Roosevelt's War Production Board). Biden also pledged to invoke the Defense Production Act more aggressively than Trump in order to build up supplies, as well as the mobilization of up to 100,000 Americans for a "public health jobs corps" of contact tracers to help track and prevent outbreaks.

== Foreign and military policy ==
=== In general ===
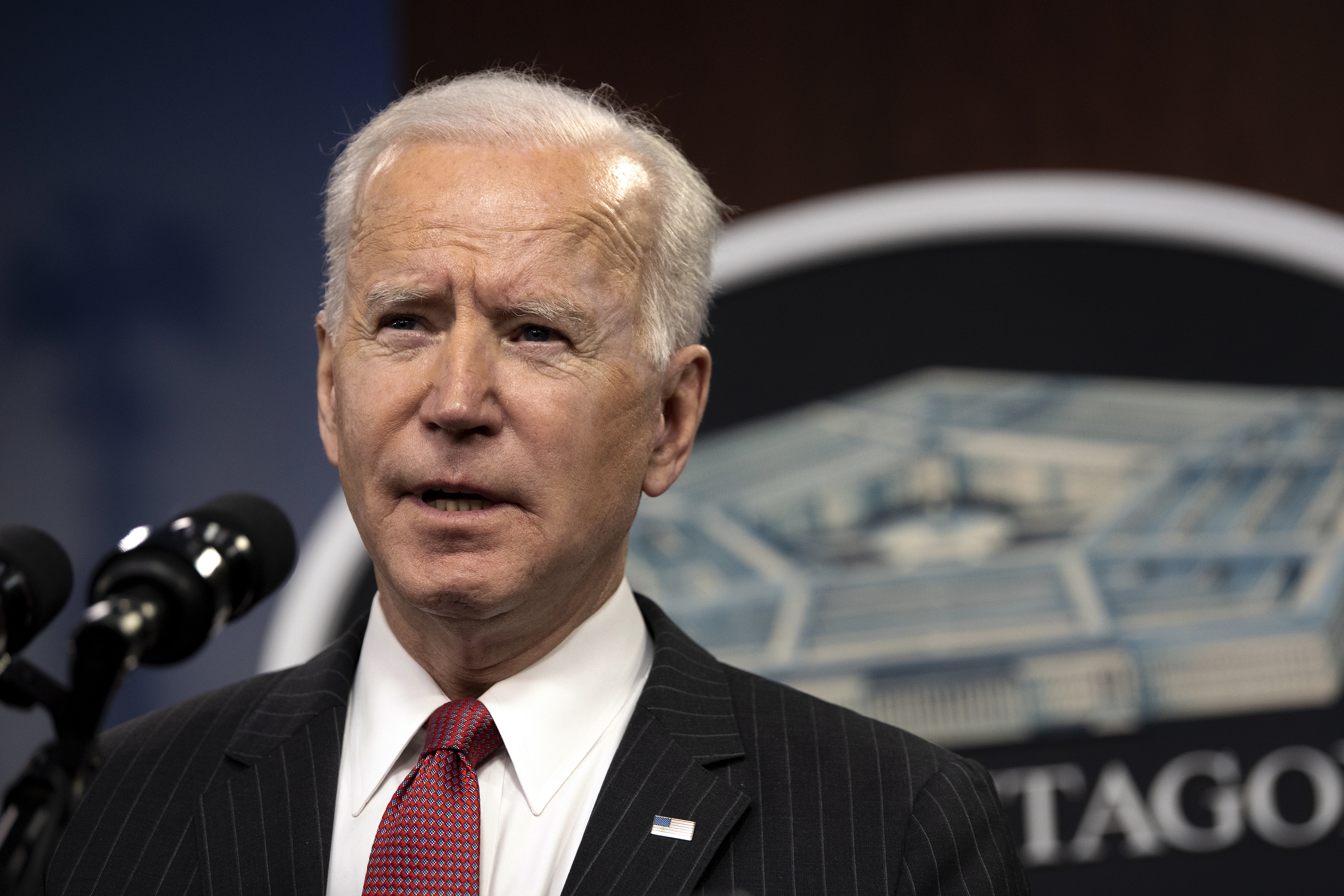
Biden speaks at The Pentagon, February 2021.

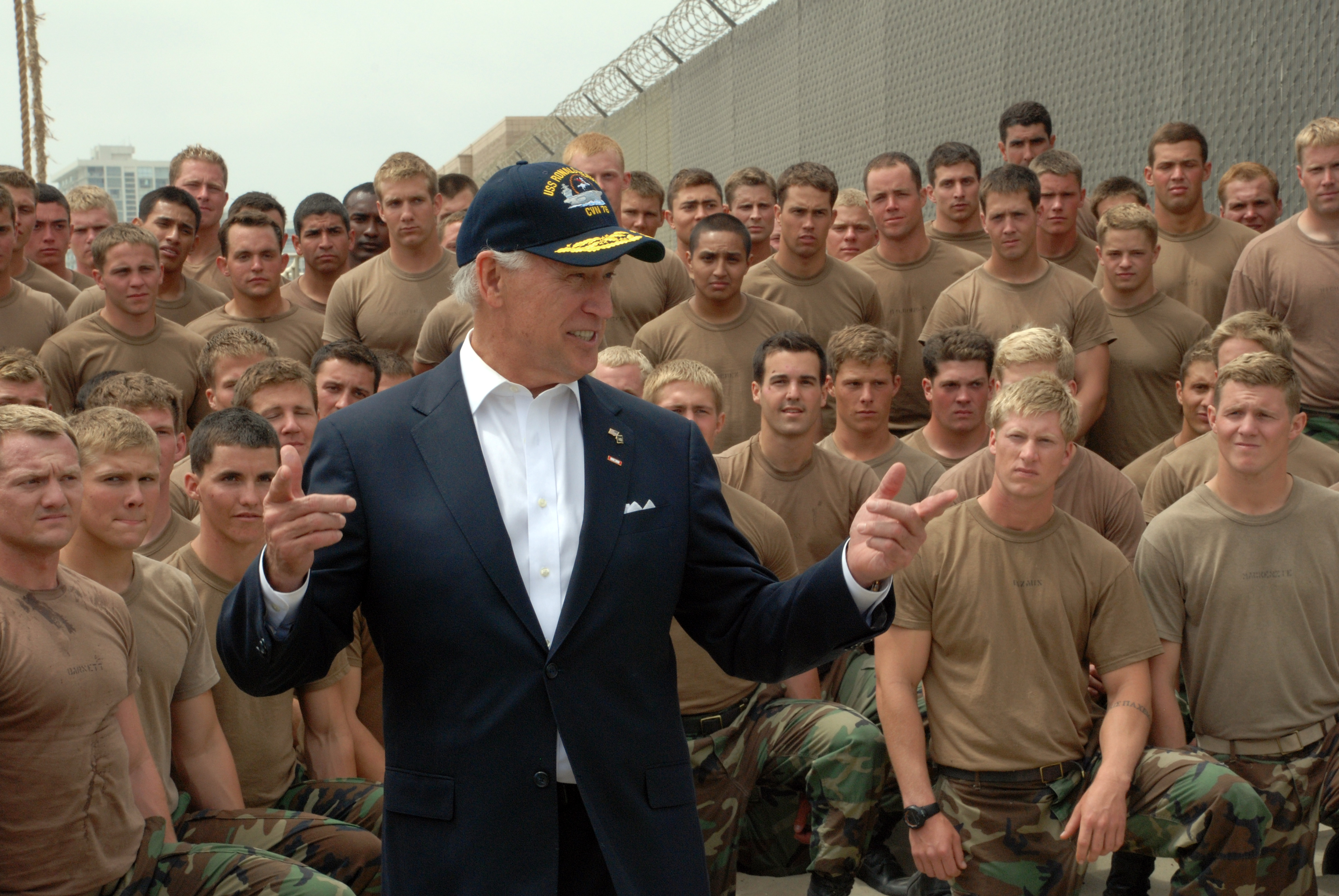
Biden speaks to Navy SEAL trainees at NAB Coronado, California, May 2009.

Biden has said that "The United States will always reserve the right to defend itself and its allies, by force, if necessary. But force must be used judiciously to protect a vital interest of the United States, only when the objective is clear and achievable, with the informed consent of the American people, and where required, the approval of Congress." He has emphasized "returning the United States to its traditional role as the leader of a world order based on promotion of democracy, multilateralism, alliance-building and diplomatic engagement" and pledged in 2020 that if elected, he would reinvigorate the U.S.'s traditional alliances, including with countries alienated by Trump, and would convene a summit of major heads of state.

Biden opposes military action aimed at regime change, but has said that "it is appropriate for us to provide nonmilitary support for opposition movements seeking universal human rights and more representative and accountable governance." With respect to humanitarian intervention, Biden has said the U.S. has "a moral duty, as well as a security interest, to respond to genocide or chemical weapons use" but that such cases "require action by the community of nations, not just the United States."

Biden has said that he plans to restore U.S. membership in key United Nations bodies, such as UN Educational, Scientific and Cultural Organization (UNESCO), the World Health Organization, and possibly the Human Rights Council.

=== Africa ===
Biden opposed U.S. government funding of abstinence-only sex education programs in Africa, and in 2007, cosponsored the HIV Prevention Act which would end President George W. Bush's mandate that one-third of all funds be earmarked to abstinence-only programs. Biden favors greater U.S. engagement with Africa to counter growing Chinese influence on the continent.

==== Libya ====
In 2011, during the Obama administration's internal debate on the Libyan Civil War, Biden opposed the U.S. intervention. Biden stated he was "strongly against going to Libya" due to the instability it would cause after Muammar Gaddafi was deposed, recounting to Charlie Rose later:

My question was, 'OK, tell me what happens.' He's gone. What happens? Doesn't the country disintegrate? What happens then? Doesn't it become a place where it becomes a petri dish for the growth of extremism? And it has.

—

Biden publicly defended the Obama administration's ultimate decision to participate in the Libya intervention, saying in 2011,

NATO got it right. In this case, America spent $2 billion and didn't lose a single life. This is more the prescription for how to deal with the world as we go forward than it has in the past.

—

==== Sudan ====
Biden favored an American deployment of troops to Darfur during the War in Darfur, saying that 2,500 U.S. troops could stop the violence in the region.

=== West Asia ===
==== Iran ====
As chairman of the Senate Foreign Relations Committee, Biden has been a prominent voice calling for "hard-headed diplomacy" with Iran. He also has called for the implementation of "coordinated international sanctions" on Iran, adding "we should complement this pressure by presenting a detailed, positive vision for U.S.–Iran relations if Iran does the right thing."

In 2007, Biden voted against a measure to declare the Islamic Revolutionary Guard Corps a terrorist organization. He wrote in December 2007 that "War with Iran is not just a bad option. It would be a disaster." Biden threatened to initiate impeachment proceedings against President Bush if he had started a war with Iran without Congressional approval. In an interview in September 2008, Biden stated that the IRGC was a terrorist organization and that the Bush administration already had the power to designate it as one. He stated that he voted against the measure out of concern that the Bush administration would misuse the measure to justify a military attack against Iran.

As vice president, Biden vigorously defended the Joint Comprehensive Plan of Action, the nuclear agreement negotiated by the Obama administration between Iran and the U.S. and other global powers. Biden has criticized Trump's withdrawal from the agreement and the Trump administration's Iran strategy as "a self-inflicted disaster," saying in 2019 that Iran had "only gotten more aggressive" since Trump "unilaterally withdrew from the hard-won nuclear agreement that the Obama-Biden Administration negotiated." Biden said, "I have no illusions about Iran. The regime has long sponsored terrorism and threatened our interests. It continues to detain American citizens. They've ruthlessly killed hundreds of protesters, and they should be held accountable for their actions. But there is a smart way to counter them, and a self-defeating way. Trump's approach is demonstrably the latter. The only way out of this crisis is through diplomacy – clear-eyed, hard-nosed diplomacy grounded in strategy, that's not about one-off decisions or one-upsmanship." If elected president, Biden said he would reenter and strengthen the nuclear agreement once Iran is in compliance.

==== Iraq ====
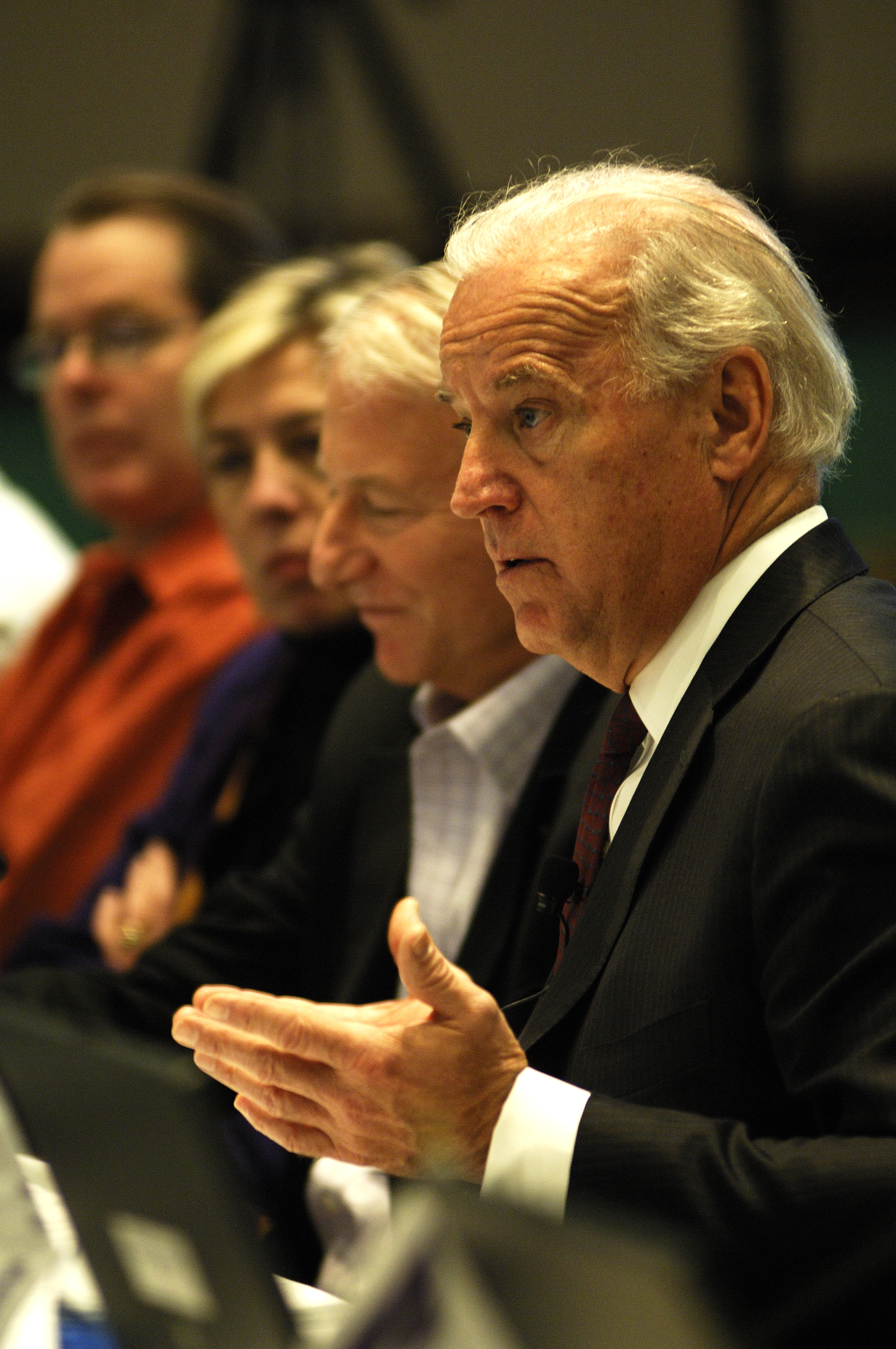
Biden speaking in January 2007

In 1990, after Iraq under Saddam Hussein invaded Kuwait, Biden voted against the first Gulf War, asking: "What vital interests of the United States justify sending Americans to their deaths in the sands of Saudi Arabia?" In 1998, Biden expressed support for the use of force against Iraq and urged a sustained effort to "dethrone" Hussein over the long haul. In 2002, as chairman of the Senate Foreign Relations Committee, he stated that Hussein was "a long-term threat and a short term threat to our national security" and that "We have no choice but to eliminate the threat. This is a guy who is an extreme danger to the world. He must be dislodged from his weapons or dislodged from power." Biden also supported a failed resolution authorizing military action in Iraq only after the exhaustion of diplomatic efforts. Biden subsequently voted in favor of the 2002 resolution that authorized the 2003 invasion of Iraq, saying, "I will vote for this because we should be compelling Iraq to make good on its obligations to the United Nations. Because while Iraq's illegal weapons of mass destruction program do not – do not – pose an imminent threat to our national security, in my view, they will, if left unfettered. And because a strong vote in Congress, as I said, increases the prospect for a tough, new U.N. resolution on weapons of mass destruction, it is likely to get weapons inspectors in, which, in turn, decreases the prospects of war, in my view."

During the Iraq War, Biden consistently criticized the George W. Bush administration for "its failure to exhaust diplomatic solutions, its failure to enlist a more robust group of allies for the war effort, and the lack of a plan for reconstruction of Iraq." He criticized Bush in March and April 2003 for failing to make robust diplomatic efforts to avert war but said at the time that it was "the right decision" to "separate him (Hussein) from his weapons and/or separate him from power." In an interview of Meet the Press in November 2005, Biden said of his 2002 vote to authorize the use of force: "It was a mistake. It was a mistake to assume the president would use the authority we gave him properly. ... We gave the president the authority to unite the world to isolate Saddam. And the fact of the matter is, we went too soon. We went without sufficient force. And we went without a plan." In 2007, Biden strongly opposed Bush's "troop surge" in Iraq, calling it a "tragic mistake." He promoted legislation to repeal and replace the 2002 resolution that authorized the war, arguing that it was no longer necessary because Hussein had been removed for power and executed, and because no weapons of mass destruction were ever found in Iraq. The replacement resolution favored by Biden would provide that U.S. troops could combat terrorism and train Iraqi forces, but begin a "responsible drawdown" of U.S. troops that would end in the withdrawal of U.S. troops from Iraq.

In May 2006, in an op-ed in The New York Times, Biden and Leslie H. Gelb, the president emeritus of the Council on Foreign Relations, proposed a plan for a decentralized, federal Iraq, with a relatively weak central government with strong Sunni, Shiite, and Kurdish regional administrations that would govern largely autonomously within their own regions. Under the plan, there would not have been a partition of the country, but the central government would have its responsibilities limited to areas of common concern, such as "border defense, foreign policy, and oil production and revenue sharing." The goal of the plan was to halt the high level of sectarian violence in Iraq between Sunnis, Shiites, and Kurds. Biden likened the plan to the 1995 Dayton Agreement, which led to an end to the Bosnian War. The plan received a mixed reception. A non-binding "sense of the Senate" resolution in support of the plan, sponsored by Biden and Senator Sam Brownback (Republican of Kansas), passed the Senate in a September 2007 on a 75–23 vote. However, the proposal was opposed by Bush administration and many Iraqi political parties, including the United Iraqi Alliance of Prime Minister Nouri al-Maliki. The autonomy/federalism proposal was broadly unpopular among Iraqi Arabs, both Sunni and Shia, but was welcomed by Iraqi Kurds and the Kurdistan Regional Government, as well as by Iraq President Jalal Talabani, a Kurd and proponent of Iraqi federalism.

In a 2016 interview with Council on Foreign Relations president Richard N. Haass, Biden spoke about changing "the fundamental approach [America] had to the Middle East", and that the lesson learned from Iraq is "the use of force with large standing armies in place was extremely costly, [and] would work until the moment we left."

==== Israel and the Arab–Israeli conflict ====
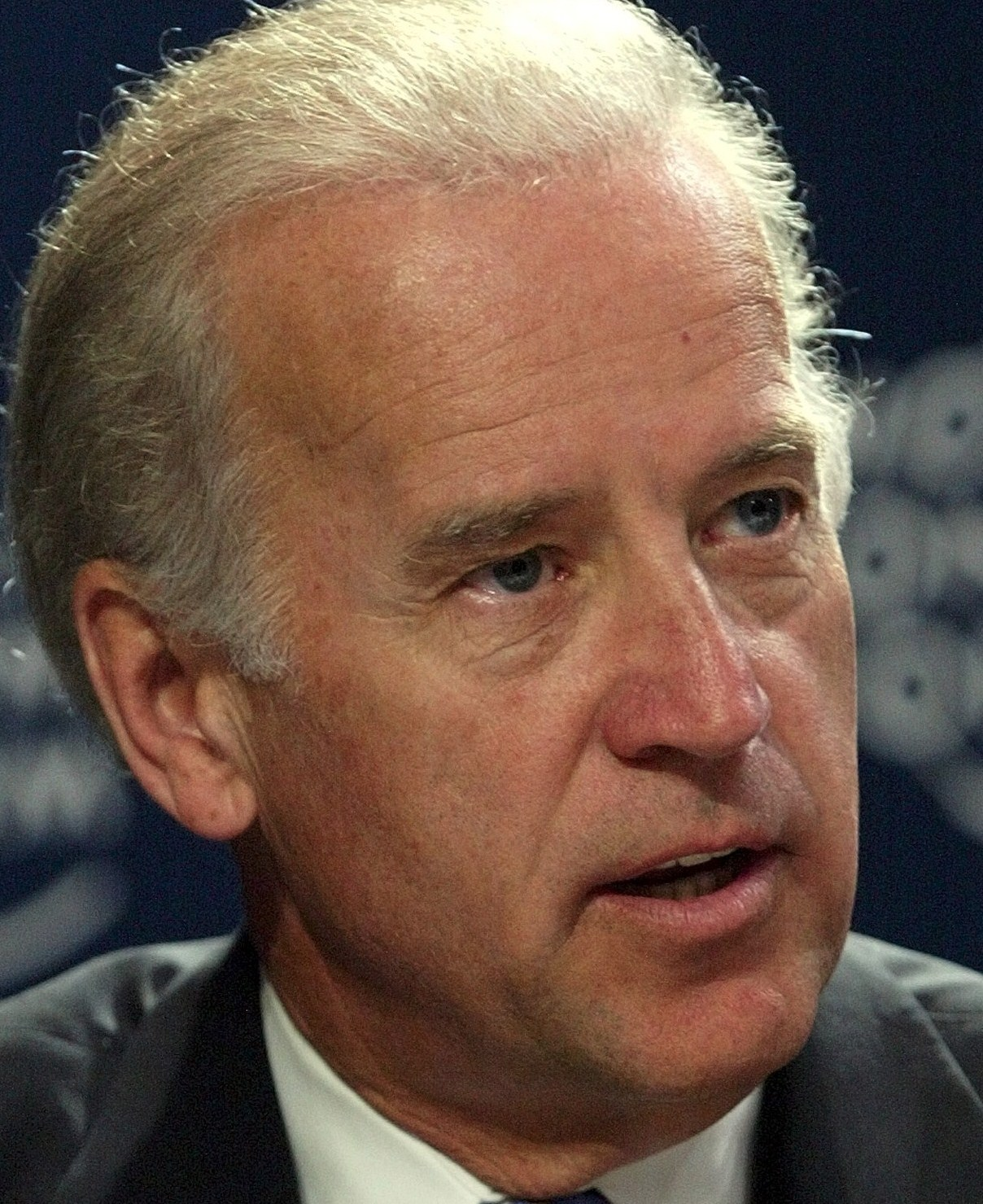
Biden at the World Economic Forum in Jordan in 2003

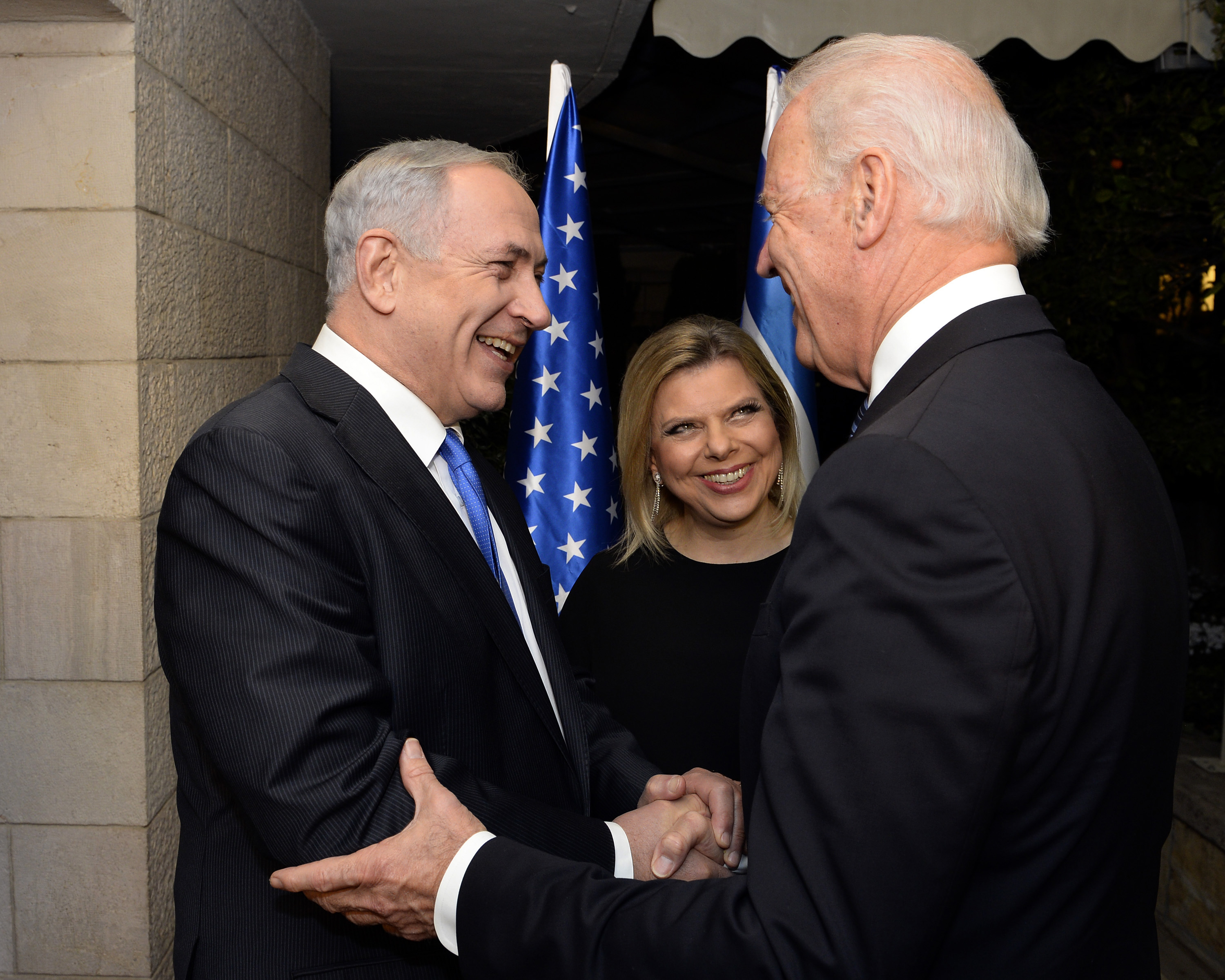
Biden with Israeli prime minister Benjamin Netanyahu, January 2014

In the Senate, Biden developed lifelong relationships with Israeli officials through his work on the Foreign Relations Committee, beginning with Golda Meir in 1973. Biden called his meeting with Meir as a young senator on the eve of the Yom Kippur War "one of the most consequential meetings I've ever had in my life." During Menachem Begin's visit to Washington, D.C. in 1982, amid the Lebanon War, Biden met with Begin, and expressed his support for Israel's actions in Lebanon, following this with a heated request for Begin to stop the settlements in the West Bank, fearing that it was hurting the American public's perception of Israel. Biden has regularly described himself as a Zionist, and is a longtime supporter of Israel, which Biden considers to be a key U.S. strategic ally in the Middle East. On the Senate floor in 1986 he defended US funding of Israel referring to it as "the best $3 billion investment we make" and declared that "were there not an Israel, the United States of America would have to invent an Israel to protect her interest in the region".

When Biden was selected by Obama as a running mate, National Jewish Democratic Council chairman Ira Forman praised the choice, saying, "There is no one you could possibly pick who knows the issues, who is committed to Israel's security and knows Israeli leaders, as much as Joe Biden." During the 2008 presidential campaign, Biden stressed in a Florida campaign event that he and his running mate Obama were both strongly pro-Israel and would make Israel more secure. Biden also said: "A strong America is a strong Israel. I have a 35-year record of supporting Israel, and Israel's security is enhanced the stronger America is." In the 2008 vice-presidential debate, Biden stated "no one in the United States Senate has been a better friend to Israel than Joe Biden. I would have never, ever joined this ticket were I not absolutely sure Barack Obama shared my passion."

In 2008, Biden criticized the George W. Bush administration and John McCain, arguing: "By any empirical standard, Israel is less secure today than it was when George Bush became president. He has made one foul-up after another that John has supported." Biden called for a proactive US role in the Israel-Palestinian peace process, which he argued would be advanced if the U.S. took steps to "regain the respect of the world." He called for increased engagement with Syria over the Golan Heights dispute, the disarmament of Hezbollah, and Syrian influence in Lebanon. In 2008, discussing the possibility of Israeli military strike on Iranian nuclear facilities, Biden said it was "not a question for us to tell the Israelis what they can and cannot do" but that he had "faith in the democracy of Israel" and supported additional diplomatic efforts to avert military conflict. In April 2009, Biden again said that Israel would not launch a unilateral strike against Iran's nuclear facilities, stating: "I think [Israel] would be ill-advised to do that. And so my level of concern is no different than it was a year ago."

Throughout his career, Biden has had a strong relationship with the American Israel Public Affairs Committee (AIPAC), speaking at the group's events and fundraisers; Biden and AIPAC have mutually praised each other. Nevertheless, Biden has not always agreed with the group's stances, saying in 2008 that "AIPAC does not speak for the entire American Jewish community. There's other organizations as strong and as consequential" and adding "I've never disagreed with AIPAC on the objective. Whenever I've had disagreement with AIPAC it has always been a tactical disagreement, not a substantive disagreement." Biden strongly opposed granting executive clemency to Jonathan Pollard, who was convicted of spying for Israel, saying "If it were up to me, he would stay in jail for life."

Biden praised the United Arab Emirates's offer to recognize Israel in an August 2020 normalization agreement, calling the agreement "a welcome, brave, and badly-needed act of statesmanship." In an effort to reduce the rise of Anti Semitism in the United States, the Biden administration launched the first ever national strategy to combat Anti Semitism on May 25, 2023.

===== Two-state solution =====
Biden has consistently supported a two-state solution to the Israeli–Palestinian conflict, saying it is (1) "the only path to long-term security for Israel, while sustaining its identity as a Jewish and democratic state"; (2) "the only way to ensure Palestinian dignity and their legitimate interest in national self-determination"; and (3) "a necessary condition to take full advantage of the opening that exists for greater cooperation between Israel and its Arab neighbors." He cosponsored the Palestinian Anti-Terrorism Act of 2006 which expressed U.S. support for a two-state solution. In a 2007 interview, when asked about the failure to achieve Israeli-Palestinians peace, Biden stated that "Israel's a democracy and they make mistakes. But the notion that somehow if Israel just did the right thing, [the peace process] would work ... give me a break." He also stated that "The responsibility rests on those who will not acknowledge the right of Israel to exist, will not play fair, will not deal, will not renounce terror." During the 2008 vice-presidential debate, Biden stated that the Bush administration's policy concerning the Middle East had been "an abject failure" and pledged that, if elected, he and Barack Obama would "change this policy with thoughtful, real, live diplomacy that understands that you must back Israel in letting them negotiate, support their negotiation, and stand with them, not insist on policies like this administration has." In a 2010 speech to the Jewish Federations of North America, Biden said "There is no substitute for direct face-to-face negotiations leading eventually to states for two people secured – the Jewish State of Israel and the viable independent state of Palestine. That is the only path to the Israeli people's decades-long quest for security, and the only path to the Palestinian people's legitimate aspirations for nationhood." Speaking in 2019, Biden said, "At the present, neither the Israeli nor Palestinian leadership seems willing to take the political risks necessary to make progress through direct negotiations," and said that if elected president, he would be focusing on urging "both sides to take steps to keep the prospect of a two-state outcome alive." Following Trump's controversial move of the U.S. Embassy in Israel from Tel Aviv to Jerusalem, Biden said he would not return the embassy to Tel Aviv if elected president, but that he would re-open the U.S. consulate in East Jerusalem for outreach to Palestinians.

Biden reaffirmed his support for a two-state solution during his presidency, noting it in an April 2021 telephone call with King Abdullah II of Jordan.

===== Settlements and annexation plans =====
Biden has consistently criticized Israeli settlement policy. In a 2009 speech at the AIPAC conference, Biden called upon Israel "to work towards a two-state solution" by dismantling existing Israeli settlements, halting new settlement construction, and allowing Palestinians freedom of movement, and called on the Palestinians to "combat terror and incitement against Israel." In a 2016 speech to J Street, Biden said that he had "overwhelming frustration" with the Israeli government and Prime Minister Benjamin Netanyahu for the government's promotion and expansion of settlements, legalization of outposts, and land seizures. Noting that he had opposed Israeli settlements for more than three decades, Biden said they are counterproductive to Israel's security. In the same speech, Biden criticized Palestinian terrorist attacks and Palestinian recourse to the International Criminal Court, which he called "damaging moves that only take us further from the path toward peace," and called out President Mahmoud Abbas for failing to condemn terrorist attacks. Regarding a multi-billion dollar defense deal that the U.S. was negotiating with Israel, Biden said "Israel will not get everything it asks for, but it will get every single solitary thing it needs," and said: "No matter what political disagreements we have with Israel – and we do have political disagreements now – there is never any question about our commitment to Israel's security." In a subsequent speech in December 2019, Biden criticized Netanyahu for his drift to "the extreme right in his party," calling this move a bid to retain political power and a "serious mistake."

Biden criticized Israel's plan to annex parts of Palestinian territory in the West Bank. In June 2020, Biden's foreign policy advisor Tony Blinken said that Biden "would not tie military assistance to Israel to things like annexation or other decisions by the Israeli government with which we might disagree." Biden said that if elected president he will firmly reject the Boycott, Divestment and Sanctions (BDS) campaign "which singles out Israel and too often veers into antisemitism – and fight other efforts to delegitimize Israel on the global stage."

==== Gaza war ====
President Biden delivers remarks on the Hamas terrorist attacks in Israel.

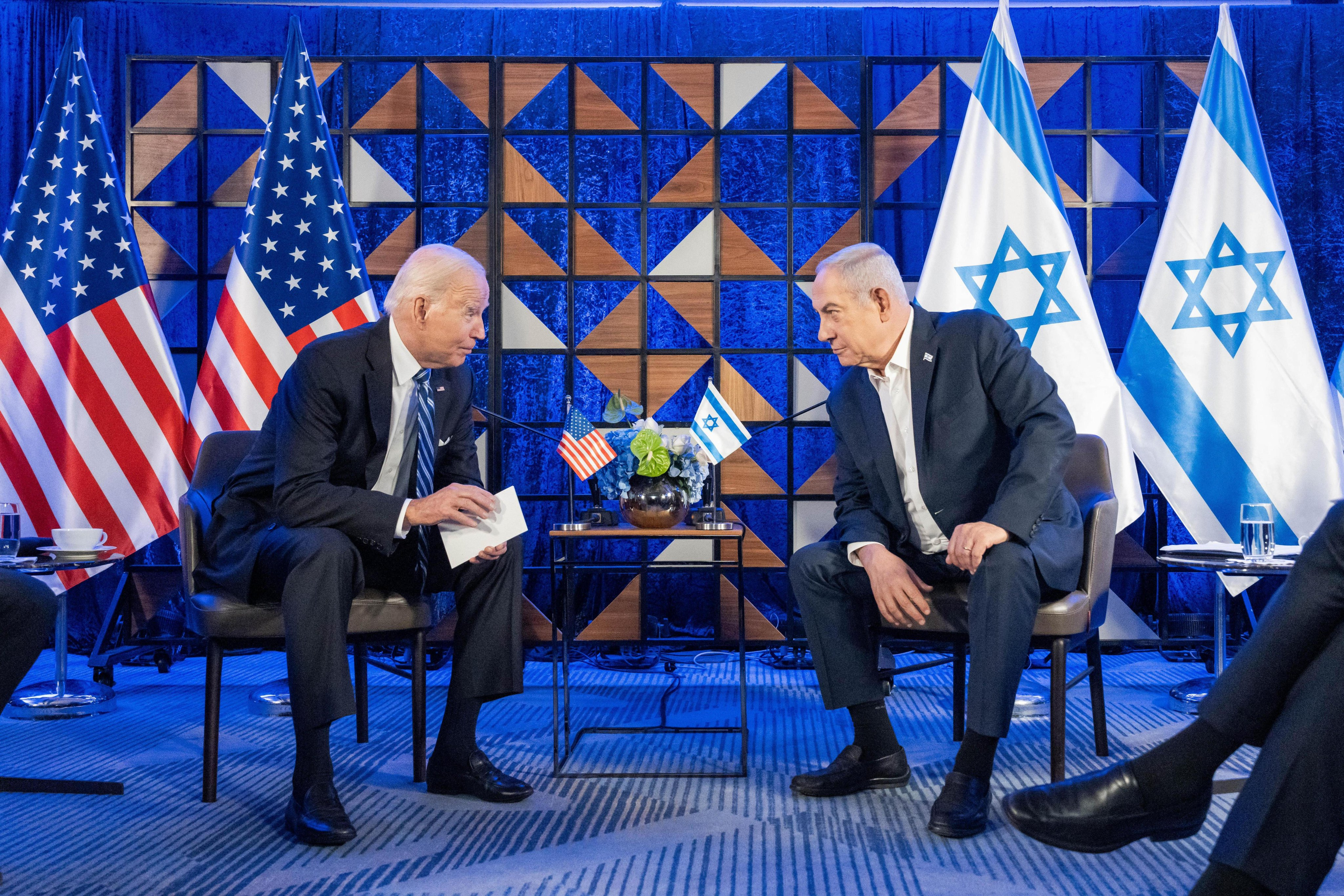
Biden and Israeli prime minister Benjamin Netanyahu, October 18, 2023

After the October 7 attack in Israel, Biden stated, "We stand with Israel" three days later and emphasized the US's role in potentially freeing American hostages in Gaza.

On October 14, Biden condemned the murder of Wadea Al-Fayoume, a six-year-old Muslim boy in Chicago, by the boy's landlord. The murder was an alleged hate crime inspired by the conflict. Biden said, "There is no place in America for hate against anyone."

During a speech at the Human Rights Campaign Dinner on October 15, a protestor chanted "let Gaza live" and "ceasefire now" to which Biden responded that he could not hear the protestor, but then later said "I get it. I'm not sure that's a good thing. No, I'm only joking."

Biden's trip to Jordan to meet King Abdullah II, Abdel Fattah el-Sisi, and Mahmoud Abbas was "mutually" canceled on October 17 and indefinitely postponed.

President Biden traveled to Tel Aviv, Israel on October 18 and met with Prime Minister Benjamin Netanyahu, resulting in humanitarian aid being allowed into Gaza, including food, water, and medicine. During the trip, Biden blamed the al-Ahli Arab Hospital explosion on "an errant rocket fired by a terrorist group in Gaza," citing US intelligence reports. He also promised to ask congress for an "unprecedented support package for Israel's defense," potentially tied to a bill with support for Ukraine, Taiwan, and the Southern Border. Biden called on Congress to pass $14.3 billion in emergency military aid to Israel. Israel already receives $3.8 billion a year in military aid. Biden also announced that the US would send $100 million in humanitarian aid to Gaza and the West Bank.

On November 1, after Jessica Rosenberg, a rabbi and activist from Jewish Voice for Peace, heckled Biden during a speech in Northfield, Minnesota calling for a ceasefire, Biden said, "I think we need a pause. A pause means give time to get the prisoners out."

Starting November 9, Biden negotiated four-hour pauses for civilians to flee every day after his push for three-day pauses failed. Starting on November 23, Israel agreed to a four-day ceasefire for north of Gaza for six hours a day and a complete ceasefire south of Gaza in exchange for hostages taken by Hamas. The deal was brokered by Qatar, Egypt, and the United States.

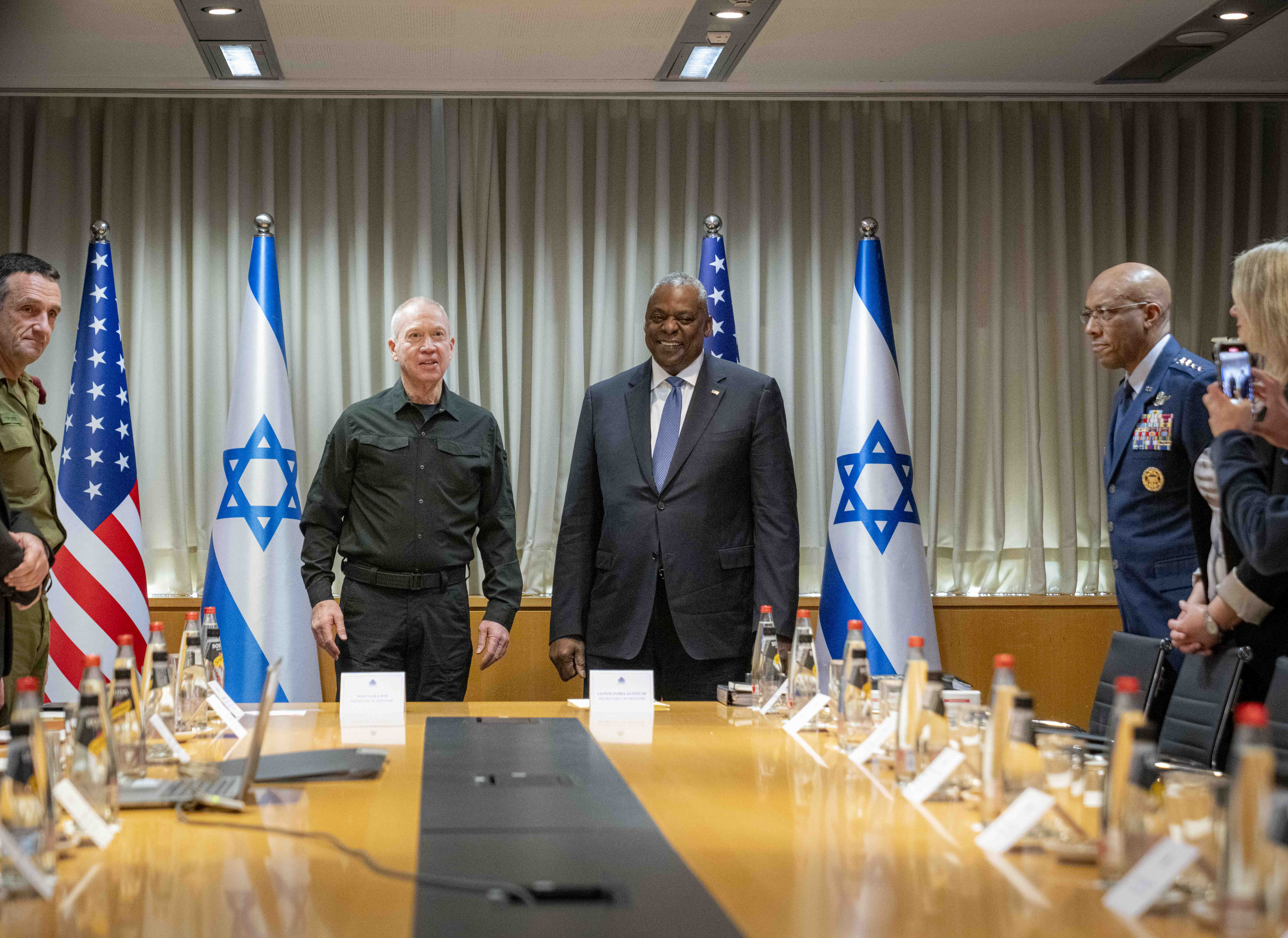
Secretary of Defense Lloyd Austin, Israeli Defense Minister Yoav Gallant, Joint Chiefs of Staff Chairman Charles Q. Brown Jr. and Israeli Chief of General Staff Herzi Halevi in Tel Aviv, Israel, December 18, 2023

Ian Bremmer, an American political scientist, stated the Biden administration's position unconditionally supporting Israel had left him as isolated on the world stage as Russia's president Vladimir Putin. Biden has reportedly expressed frustration with Netanyahu's handling of the war, although this has not led to a major shift in American policy.

Congressional oversight on arms sales has been sidestepped by the Biden administration on two occasions in December 2023. Usually the Arms Export Control Act would require the State Department, on behalf of the president, to provide U.S. Congress advance notification of government-to-government foreign military sales of defense equipment. But the secretary of state Antony Blinken certified the existence of an "emergency" and therefore the requirement was lifted twice which raised objections from lawmakers from the Democratic Party.

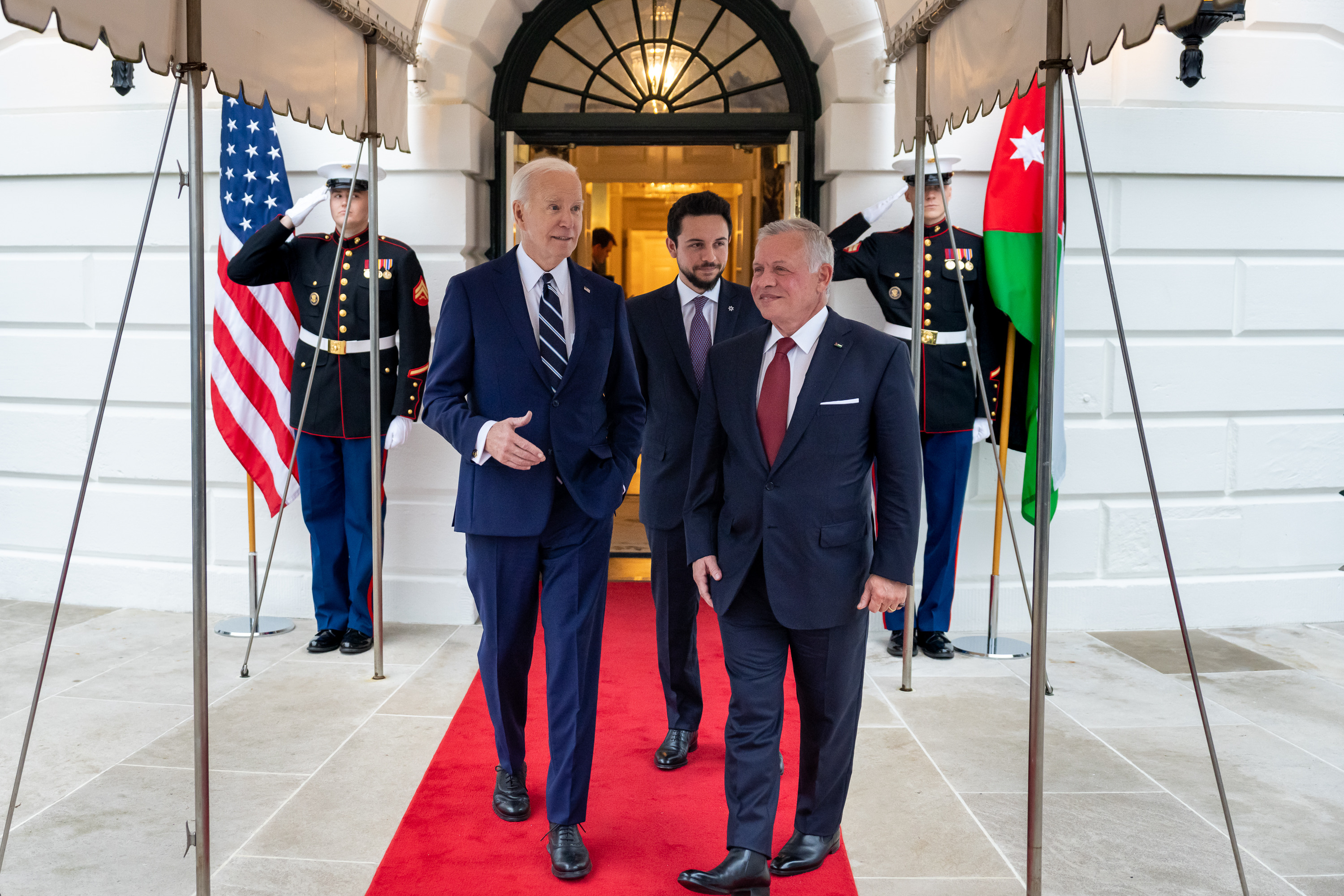
Abdullah II of Jordan and Crown Prince Hussein with President Biden in February 2024

In February 2024, the Biden administration warned the government of Israel against its announced advance against Rafah, and NBC news reported that Biden "has been venting his frustration in recent private conversations, some of them with campaign donors, over his inability to persuade Israel to change its military tactics in the Gaza Strip". On February 16, 2024, The Wall Street Journal reported that the administration is pushing for a cease-fire deal but on the other hand is preparing another delivery of bombs and other weapons and that the administration has to notify "congressional committee leaders who would need to approve the transfer." On February 20, the U.S. government vetoed a U.N. Security Council resolution demanding a cease-fire in Gaza.

After the killing of Palestinian civilians receiving food aid on February 29, Biden expressed that the current level of aid flowing into Gaza was insufficient. On March 3, US military began airdropping food aid into Gaza. Some experts called the US airdrops performative and claimed they would do little to alleviate the food situation in Gaza. In July 2024, following Biden's decision not to seek re-election, Palestinian advocacy groups stated they believed that the war would define Biden's presidential legacy.

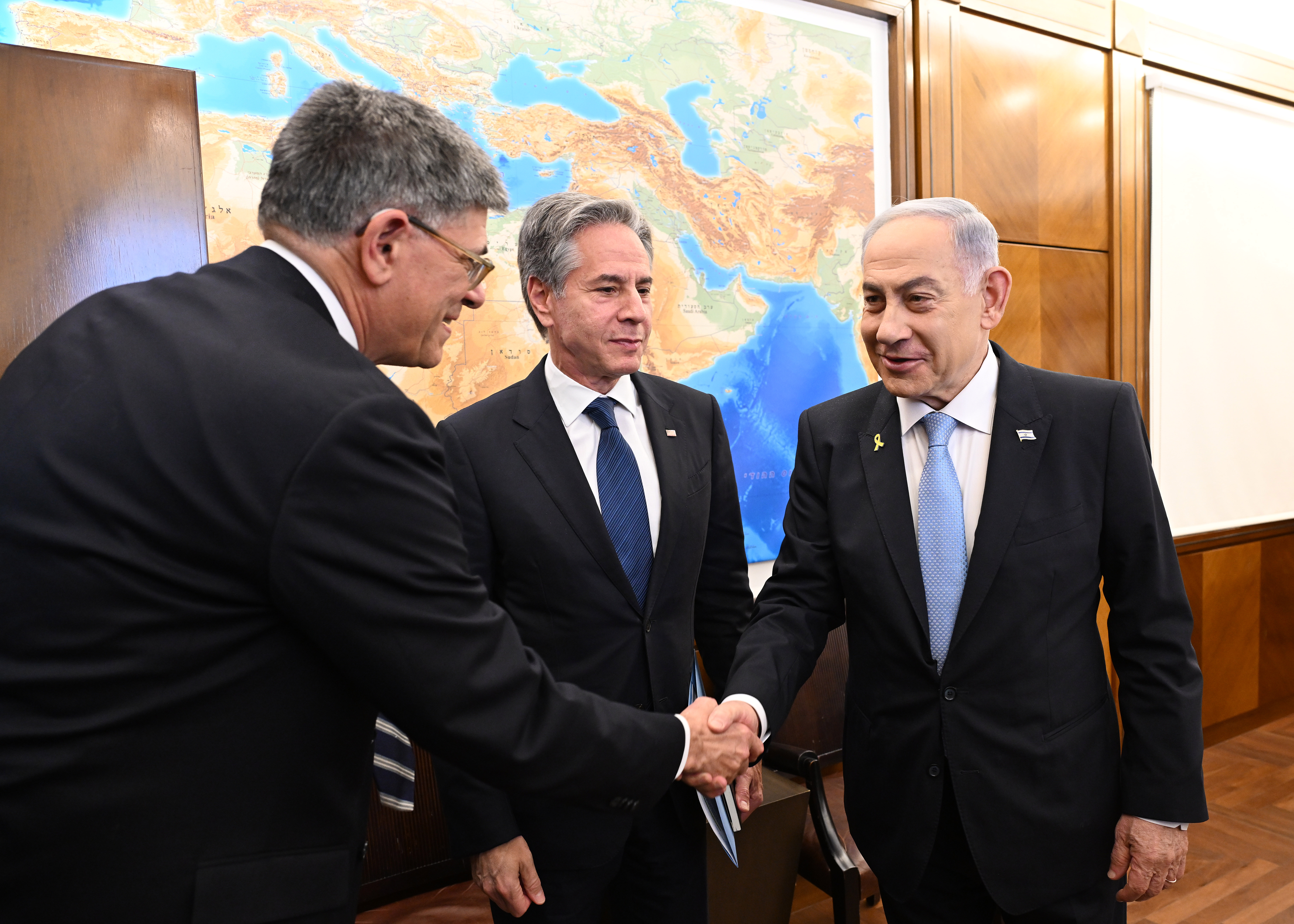
Israeli Prime Minister Netanyahu with US ambassador to Israel Jack Lew (left) and US Secretary of State Antony Blinken, August 19, 2024

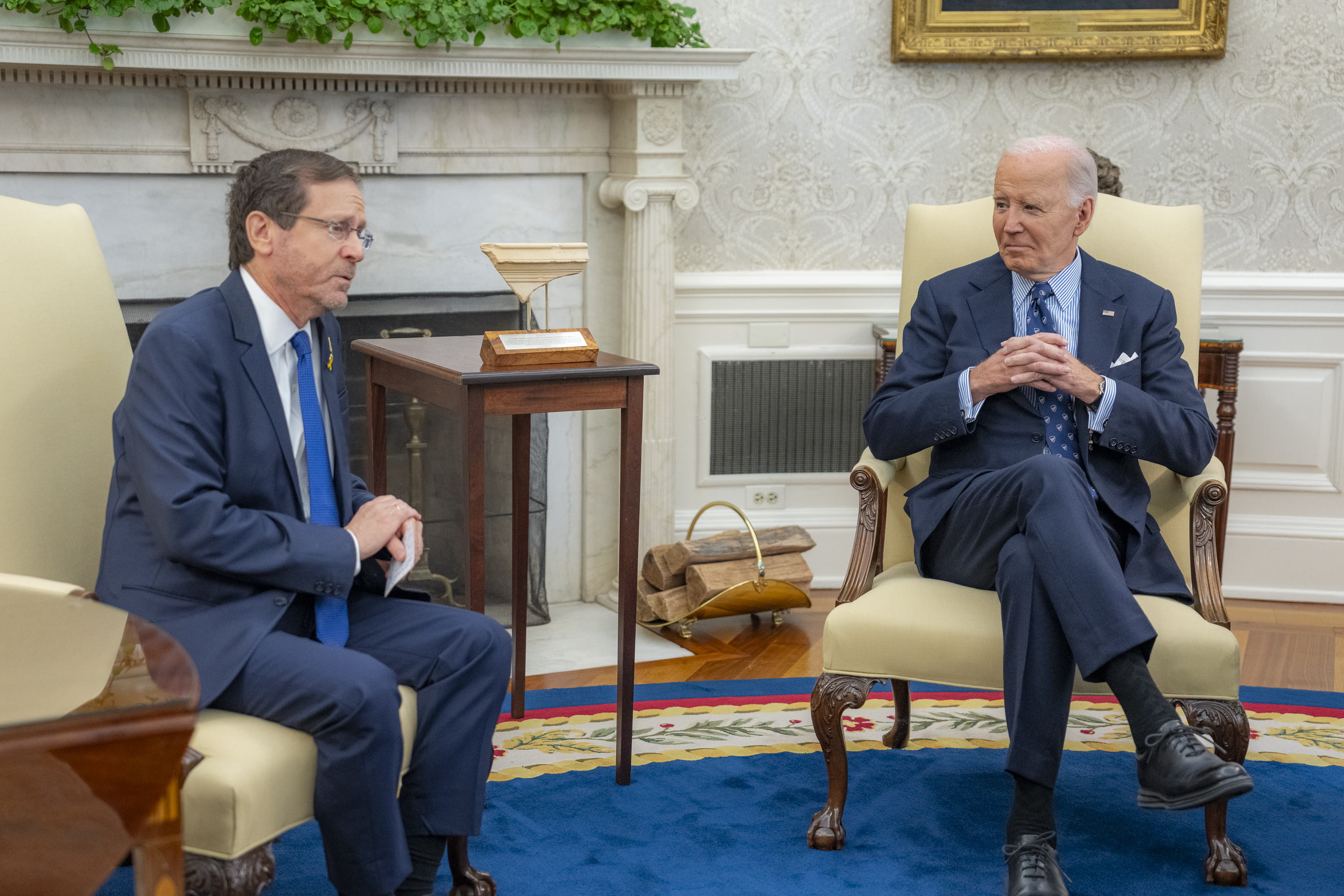
President Biden and Israeli President Isaac Herzog, November 12, 2024

On March 30, 2024, the Biden administration authorized $2.5 billion in weapons transfers to Israel. On April 24, 2024, Biden signed a $95 billion security package which included around $17 billion in military aid for Israel. In June 2024, the United States officially signed a Letter of Offer and Acceptance, allowing Israel to purchase 25 additional Lockheed Martin F-35 stealth fighter jets for $3 billion.

On July 10, 2024, the Biden administration resumed shipments of the 500-pound bombs to Israel, which were halted in May over concerns about the humanitarian impact of Israel's use of them in killing Palestinians in Gaza. On August 9, 2024, the Department of State said the United States would send Israel an additional $3.5 billion to spend on US-made weapons and military equipment. On August 13, 2024, the Department of State announced that the U.S. had approved a $20 billion weapons package sale to Israel, which included fighter jets and advanced air-to-air missiles.

On September 17, 2024, thousands of handheld pagers used by Hezbollah simultaneously exploded across Lebanon and Syria. The attack came just a day after the Biden administration's special envoy Amos Hochstein visited Israel and warned Benjamin Netanyahu against provoking a major escalation in Lebanon.

On November 20, 2024, a UN Security Council draft resolution that demanded an immediate and unconditional ceasefire in the Gaza Strip was vetoed by the U.S. whereas all other members voted in favor. The draft resolution would have rejected "any effort to starve Palestinians" and demanded the facilitation of full, rapid, safe and unhindered entry of aid at scale to and throughout the Strip and its delivery to all those in need. On January 15, 2025, a ceasefire proposal backed by Biden was adopted just days before his leaving office.

==== Saudi Arabia ====
Biden has called Saudi Arabia a pariah state. Biden criticized U.S. involvement in the Saudi Arabian-led intervention in Yemen, accusing Saudi Arabia of killing "innocent people" in that war. He said that if elected president, he would end US involvement in that war and re-assess Saudi Arabia-United States relations. He criticized the Trump administration's sale of arms to Saudi Arabia.

Saudi Arabia reportedly took more than 24 hours to congratulate Joe Biden on his November 3, 2020, presidential election victory. Biden demanded more accountability over Jamal Khashoggi's murder from Saudi Arabia during his campaigns. The elections saw the defeat of Donald Trump who had close personal ties with the Saudi crown prince Mohammed bin Salman.

==== Syria ====
In a 2018 conversation for Foreign Affairs, Biden described Syria as "a classic example of the biggest conundrum that we have to deal with." He sees America's current situation in Syria as having "lost the notion among our European friends that we know what we're doing, that we have a plan." He emphasized the necessity of stabilizing Syria, especially in major cities like Raqqa. Raqqa is in ruins after lengthy battles between ISIL and Kurdish forces, the SDF, with assistance from the U.S.-led coalition. Biden said a multi-billion dollar investment is required to rebuild the city. He believes Iran, not Russia, will be the biggest beneficiaries in the short term if Syria remains a battlefield. President Bashar al-Assad will also need to be removed from power, otherwise Syria will never have peace or security. Biden said there is no uniting principle in Syria, unlike Iraq, hence only certain safe harbors can be established in the region to reduce the number of displaced people and deaths.

==== Turkey ====
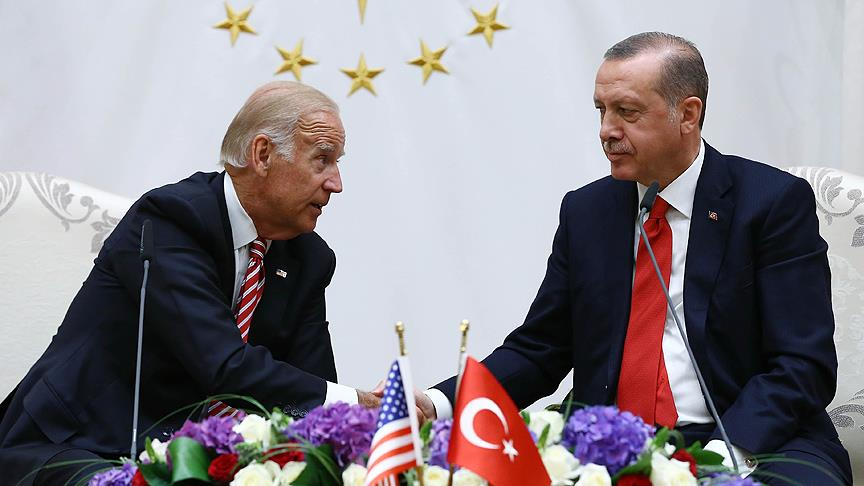
Biden meets with Turkish president Erdoğan on July 24, 2016.

In 2014, Biden said that Turkey, Saudi Arabia and the United Arab Emirates had "poured hundreds of millions of dollars and tens of thousands of tons of weapons into anyone who would fight against Assad, except that the people who were being supplied were al-Nusra, and al-Qaeda, and the extremist elements of jihadis coming from other parts of the world." Shortly afterward, Biden later apologized to the Turkish president Recep Tayyip Erdoğan over comments that Turkey supported jihadist rebels in Syria. However, Biden has remained strongly critical of Erdoğan; in December 2019, Biden referred to Erdoğan as an "autocrat" and criticized his treatment of the Kurds in Turkey, Turkish military links with Russia (including Turkey's purchase of Russian missile defense equipment), and the Turkish government's threats to limit access to U.S. airfields in Turkey.

Biden has long been a supporter of the rights of the Kurds. In 2020, Biden told Kurdistan 24, "Masoud Barzani is a good friend of mine, and I wished we could have done more for the Kurds." When asked why he could not, Biden said: "Turkey." Biden has criticized the Kurdish separatist organization PKK; in 2016, he said the PKK was a terrorist group "plain and simple" and compared it to ISIL. Also in 2016, Biden warned Kurds against seeking a separate state on the Turkish-Syrian border.

In 2016, Biden condemned the coup attempt in Turkey, but also criticized the Turkish government's subsequent campaign of repression against journalists, political dissidents, and academics, and violations of freedom of speech. Biden also rebuffed attempts by Erdoğan and the Turkish government to pressure the U.S. to extradite dissident cleric Fethullah Gulen to Turkey, noting that under U.S. law, the matter was for the legal system and federal courts to decide, and the Obama administration had no proper role. (The Turkish government has clashed with Gulen, accusing him of orchestrating the coup attempt; Gulen denies the allegation).

In September 2020, Biden demanded that Turkey "stay out" of the Nagorno-Karabakh conflict between Azerbaijan and Armenia, in which Turkey has supported the Azeris. In 2021, Biden became the first US president to formally recognize the genocide of Armenians by the Ottoman Empire, Turkey's predecessor state, during World War I. This strained relations with Turkey, which denies the genocide; Erdoğan demanded that Biden withdraw recognition and invoked the destruction of Native American peoples by the US to accuse him of hypocrisy.

=== South Asia ===
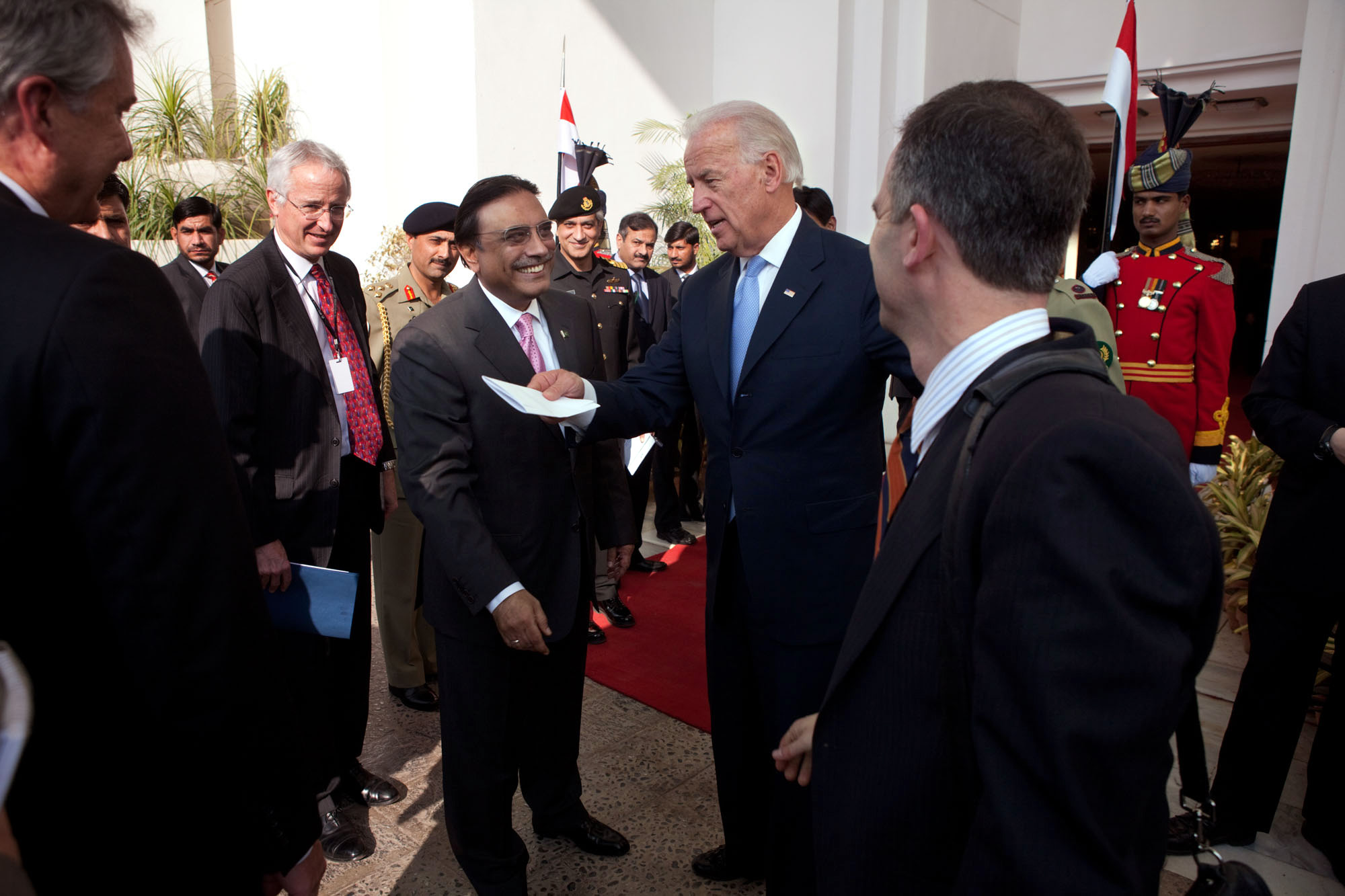
Biden meeting Pakistani president Asif Ali Zardari during a visit to Islamabad on January 12, 2011

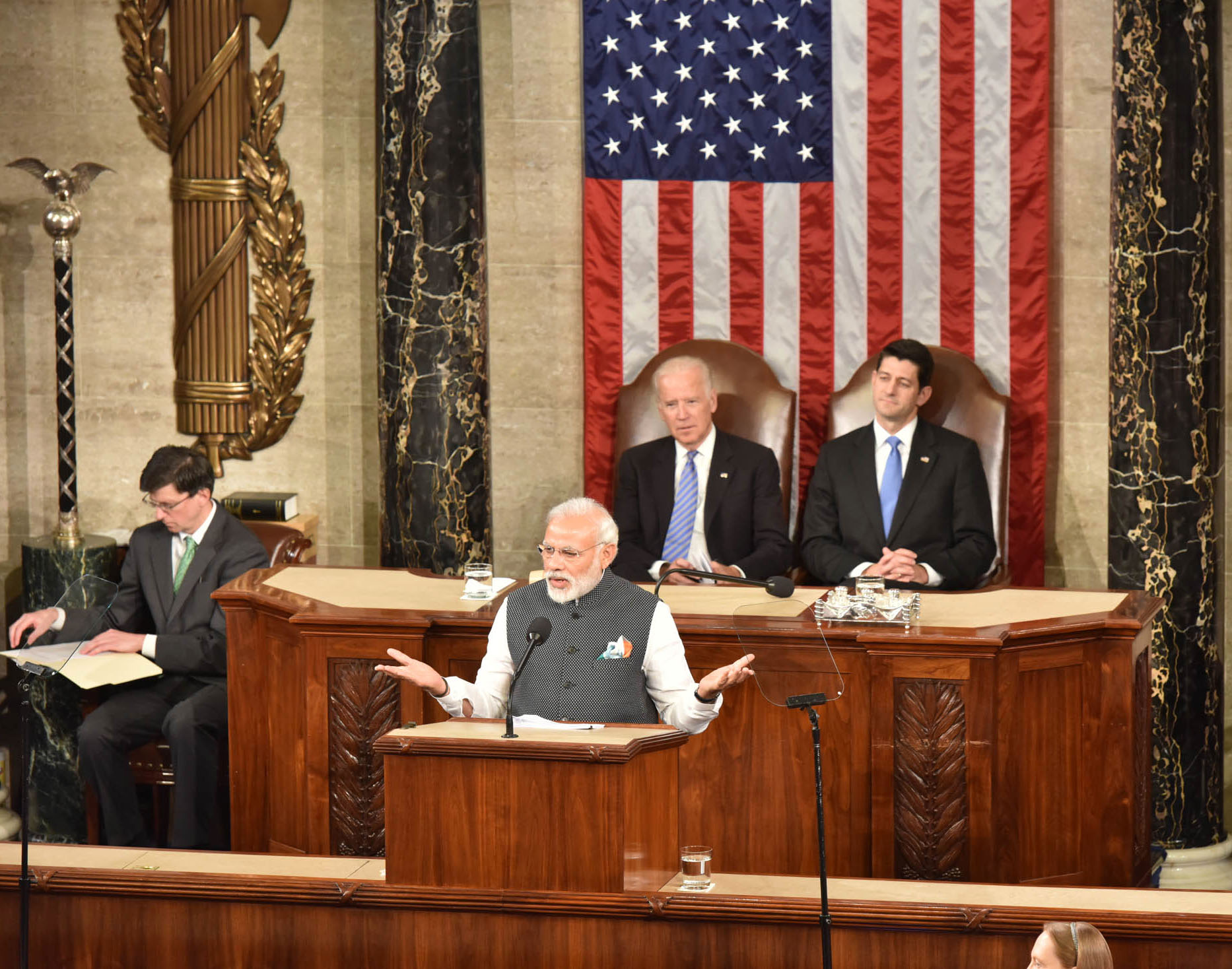
Biden and Speaker of the House Paul Ryan look on as Indian prime minister Narendra Modi addresses a joint meeting of Congress on June 8, 2016.

==== Afghanistan and Pakistan ====
Biden was a strong supporter of the War in Afghanistan, saying, "Whatever it takes, we should do it."

In 2008, Pakistan awarded the Hilal-e-Pakistan (Crescent of Pakistan) to Joe Biden and Senator Richard Lugar "in recognition of their consistent support for Pakistan". This was after Biden passed a bill authorizing $7.5 billion in non-military aid to Pakistan as the chairman of the Senate Foreign Relations Committee.

In a 2008 interview, Biden criticized Bush for presenting Iraq as the primary front against terrorism, saying the U.S. should "urgently shift our focus" from Iraq to the Afghanistan-Pakistan border region, which Biden described as "the real central front on the so-called war on terrorism," noting that "The Afghanistan-Pakistan border is where the 9/11 attacks were plotted... It's where most attacks on Europe since 9/11 have originated. It's where Osama bin Laden lives and his top confederates still enjoy safe haven, planning new attacks. Biden said that "the outcome of that battle is going to be determined less by bullets than by dollars and determination" and that the U.S.'s "original sin was starting a war of choice [the intervention in Iraq] before we finished a war of necessity [the war in Afghanistan]."

During the Obama administration's internal debates, Biden argued strongly against the 2009 surge of troops to Afghanistan, putting him on the opposite side of Defense Secretary Robert Gates. Biden argued that rampant corruption and ineffectiveness in the Afghan government, military, and police made the U.S. strategy unworkable, and was "agnostic" about the survival of the Kabul-based government. In 2012, speaking to West Point graduates, Biden argued that the Obama administration's drawdown of troops in Afghanistan and Iraq allowed the U.S. "enabled us to replace and rebalance our foreign policy" to focus on other challenges. In 2020, during his presidential campaign, Biden pledges to bring home the remaining U.S. combat forces in Afghanistan during his first term in office, and that "any residual U.S. military presence in Afghanistan would be focused only on counterterrorism operations."

=== East Asia ===
With respect to Asia, Biden favors restoring the "traditional U.S. stance supporting the presence of American troops in Japan and South Korea."

==== China ====
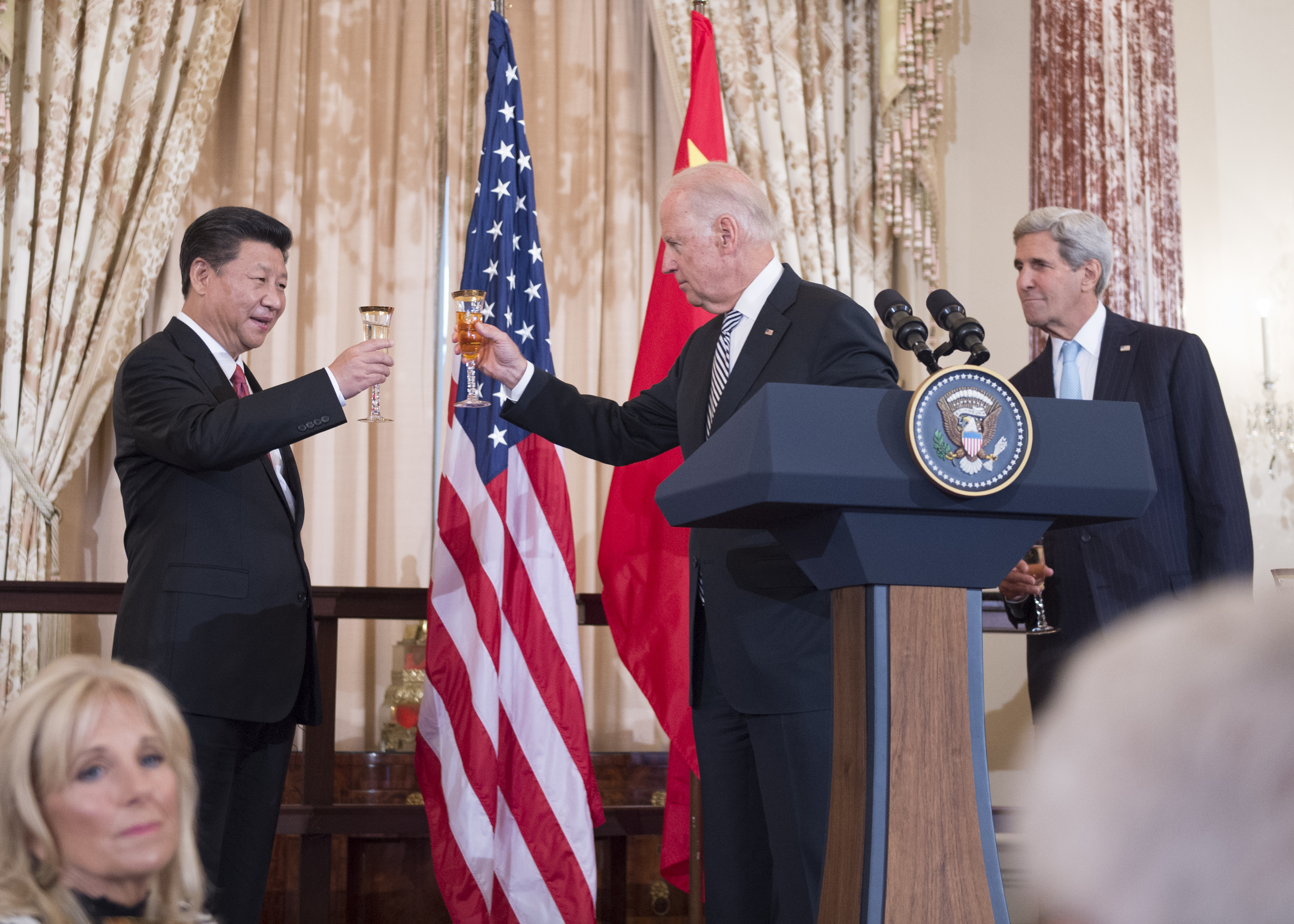
Biden and Chinese leader Xi Jinping raised a toast at a State Dinner in September 2015.

In 2016, Biden described the Trans-Pacific Partnership as an agreement that was as much about geopolitics as economics. Being part of the Obama administration, he supported the agreement in an attempt to "rebalance towards Asia" against a stronger and bolder Chinese foreign policy in the region.

Biden first visited China in April 1979, where met with then-Chinese leader Deng Xiaoping on the first U.S. congressional delegation to China since the 1949 revolution. In 2000, he voted in favor of normalizing trade relations with China and supported China's entry into the World Trade Organization. Over the years, Biden has frequently criticized the Chinese government for its human rights abuses, while also acknowledging the need to gain Chinese cooperation on issues such as climate change, Iran and North Korea. Biden was outraged by the Chinese government's violent repression of the 1989 Tiananmen Square protests, and in the Senate introduced legislation to create the democracy-promoting Radio Free Asia, which opened in 1996 and continues to operate. In June 2019, Biden wrote, "China's continuing oppression of its own people, especially the abuse and internment of more than one million Uyghurs, is one of the worst human rights crises in the world today. It can't be ignored." Biden termed the Chinese actions against the Uyghurs in Xinjiang province a genocide. Also in 2020, Biden expressed support for Hong Kong's protests.

In 2018, Biden said he had spent more time in private meetings with Chinese Communist Party leader Xi Jinping than any other world leader. He has criticized Xi as "a guy who doesn't have a democratic – with a small d – bone in his body. This is a guy who is a thug." Biden pledged, if elected, to sanction and commercially restrict Chinese government officials and entities who carry out repression. In 2019, Biden said that China is "not competition" for the United States, drawing criticism from prominent members of both parties. In 2021, Biden called China America's "most serious competitor". On February 10, Biden spoke to Xi for the first time after taking office as U.S. president and told a bipartisan group of U.S. senators, "If we don't get moving, they are going to eat our lunch."

==== North Korea ====
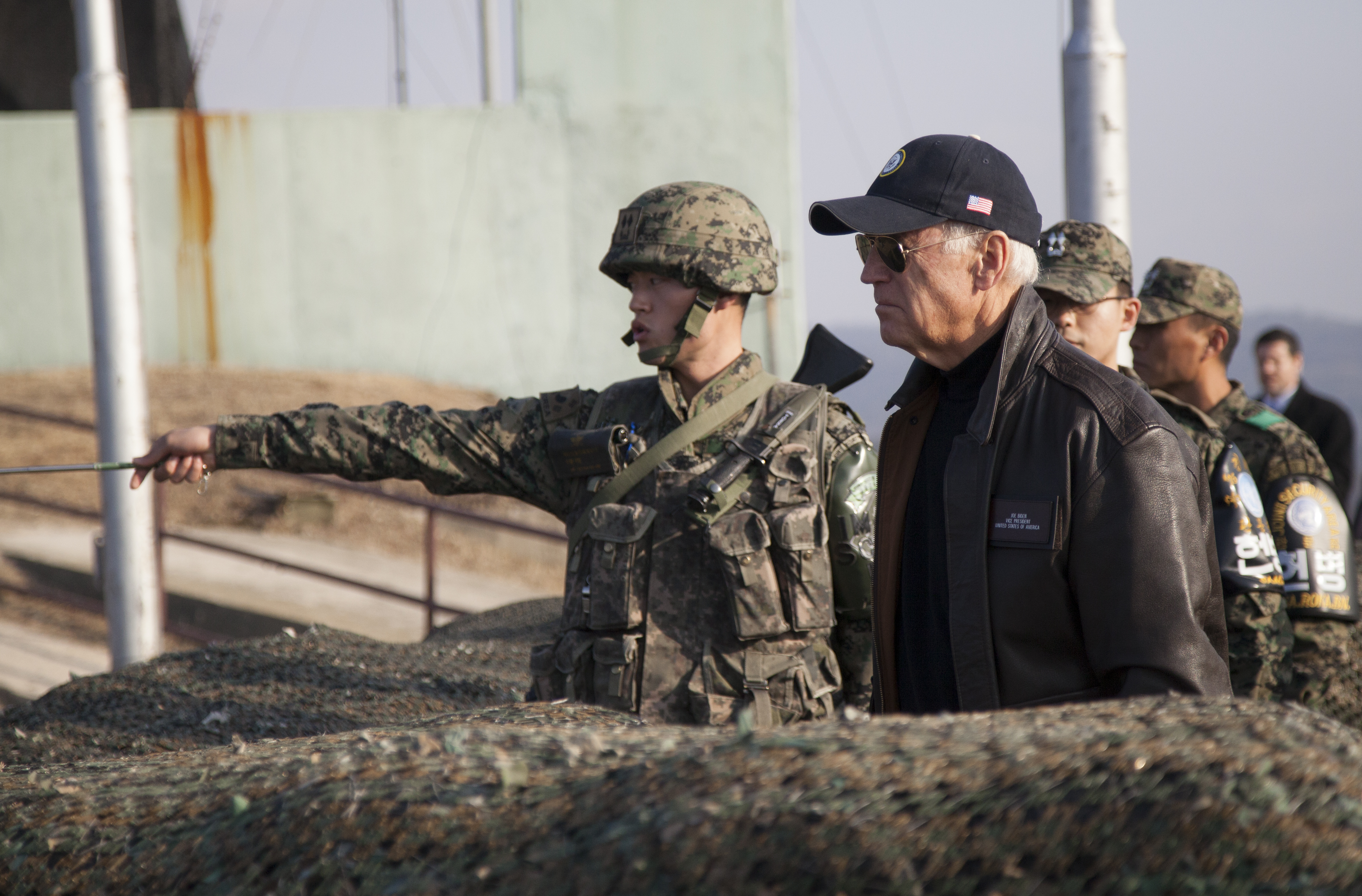
Biden looks across the Korean Demilitarized Zone towards North Korea in 2013.

Speaking in 2006, Biden described North Korea as a "paper tiger" that lacked the capacity to directly cause harm to America, but condemned North Korean nuclear testing as a "deliberate and dangerous provocation." He proposed a requirement, included in the 2007 national defense authorization act, for the Bush administration to appoint a special coordinator on North Korea, and described Korean Peninsula tensions as one of "the three most important things that the next president is going to have to deal with" (along with policy on Iraq and Iran).

As vice president, Biden visited South Korean president Park Geun-hye and visited the Korean Demilitarized Zone. In a 2013 speech in Seoul, Biden said: "The United States and the world have to make it absolutely clear to Kim Jong-un that the international community will not accept or tolerate nuclear arms in North Korea. The simple fact is this—North Korea can never achieve security and prosperity so long as it pursues nuclear weapons, period. We are prepared to go back to the six-party talks when North Korea demonstrates its full commitment to a complete, verifiable and irreversible denuclearization."

Biden has criticized Trump's warm personal relations with Kim as "antithetical to who we are," saying, "Are we a nation that embraces dictators and tyrants like (Russian President Vladimir) Putin and Kim Jong-un?" Biden also criticized Trump for engaging in "three made-for-TV summits" that have led to no "concrete commitment from North Korea." Biden has pledged, if elected president, to discontinue Trump's direct personal diplomacy with Kim and engage in a "sustained, coordinated campaign with our allies and others" to pressure North Korea toward denuclearization." North Korean state media attacked Biden in 2019 as "an imbecile"; a spokesman for Biden's campaign responded: "Trump has also been repeatedly tricked into making major concessions to the murderous regime in Pyongyang while getting nothing in return. Given Vice President Biden's record of standing up for American values and interests, it's no surprise that North Korea would prefer that Donald Trump remain in the White House."

In May 2021, President Biden expressed his and South Korea's commitment to "the complete denuclearization of the Korean Peninsula...[and addressing North Korea's] nuclear and ballistic missile programs."

=== Europe ===
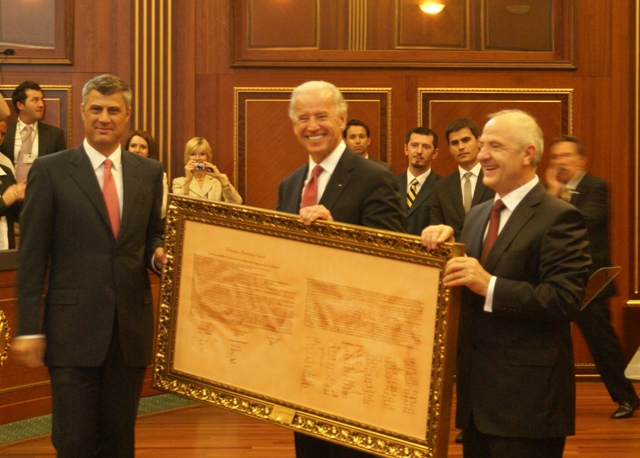
Prime Minister of Kosovo Hashim Thaçi and Biden with Declaration of Independence of Kosovo, May 21, 2009

==== Balkans ====
In the 1990s, Biden was involved in efforts to stop the Bosnian genocide by Bosnian Serb forces. He supported the "lift and strike" policy of lifting the arms embargo, training Bosnian Muslims and supporting them with NATO air strikes, and investigating war crimes. Biden supported sending in the American airforce to blow up "all of the bridges on the Drina" and to take out their oil supplies. Biden has called his role in affecting Balkans policy in the mid-1990s his "proudest moment in public life" related to foreign policy.

During the Kosovo War (1999), Biden supported US military intervention against the Federal Republic of Yugoslavia (Serbia and Montenegro). He was strongly critical of Serbia, saying that Serbs are "illiterates, degenerates, baby killers and rapists". He co-sponsored a resolution with John McCain for use of force by the US to halt Yugoslav military actions toward Kosovo Albanians. Biden has pressed Serbia over the issue of missing persons and war crimes. He supports the independence of Kosovo and considers it "irreversible". In 2010 he referred to the Kosovar Prime Minister Hashim Thaci as "the George Washington of Kosovo".

In his 2020 presidential campaign, Biden supports an agreement of mutual recognition between Kosovo and Serbia, and for Kosovo to attain EU visa liberalisation. He also supports Albania's territorial security and its reform agenda aimed toward becoming a future EU member. Biden supports Bosnian territorial integrity and sovereignty, its multi-ethnic society and future membership in NATO and the EU.

==== NATO allies ====
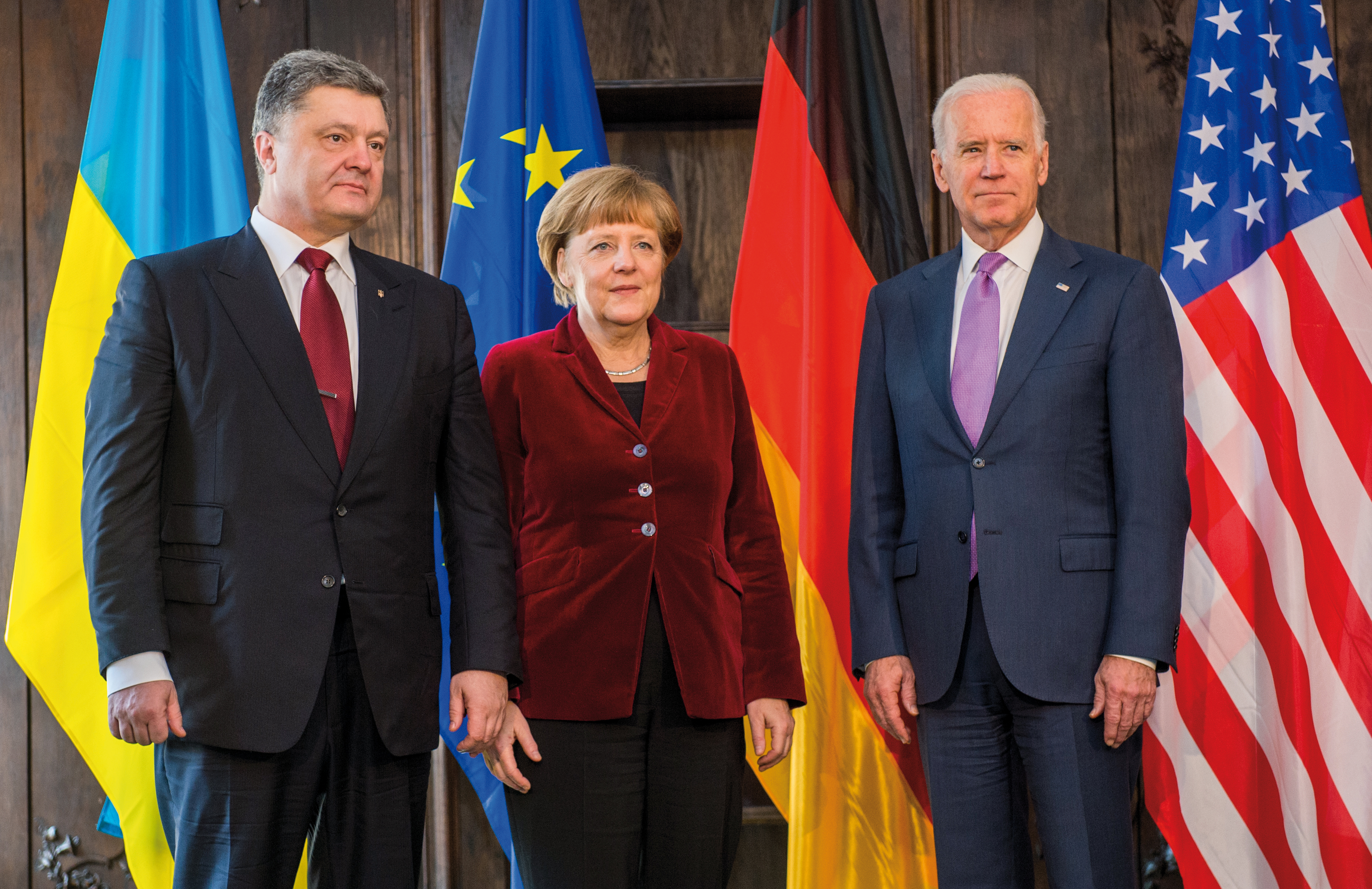
Biden with German Chancellor Angela Merkel on February 7, 2015

During his campaign for the presidency, Biden has called for restoring friendly U.S. relationship with fellow NATO member states, which have been strained by insults and antagonism from Trump, as well as by criticism by Trump of NATO and other multilateral alliances. Biden criticized Trump's decision to withdraw 9,500 U.S. troops stationed in Germany. Biden has criticized Trump for treating NATO as "a protection racket" rather than "the most significant military alliance in the history of the world" and Biden advisors have identified a strengthened NATO as a key component of countering a rising China.

==== UK and Ireland ====
According to European diplomats and trade experts, a Biden presidency would likely lead to a boost in the U.S.-British "special relationship"; repair alliances broken during the Trump administration; and enhance the likelihood of a trans-Atlantic trade agreement. Biden is a staunch supporter of the European Union (EU).

Biden's victory in the 2020 presidential election caused consternation among some in the unionist community due to comments made in the past indicating apparent sympathies to Irish republicanism. DUP representatives in particular criticized a joking comments made by Vice-President Biden on St Patrick's Day 2015 to the Irish Taoiseach Enda Kenny; "anyone wearing orange is not welcome in here". The color orange in Northern Ireland and the Republic of Ireland is associated with the Orange Order and Protestantism more generally.

Regarding Brexit, Biden in 2020 warned the British government not to jeopardize peace in Northern Ireland by negating the rules and regulations of the 1998 Good Friday Agreement, and has said that "Any trade deal between the US and UK must be contingent upon respect for the agreement and preventing the return of a hard border" between Northern Ireland and the Republic of Ireland. Speaking in 2020, former U.S. ambassador to the EU Anthony L. Gardner said that "Joe Biden believes that the triangle of relationships, US–UK, UK–EU, US and EU, all have to work together, and you will see statements to that effect."

==== Poland ====
Biden condemned "LGBT-free zones" in Poland, saying they "have no place in the European Union or anywhere in the world."

==== Russia ====
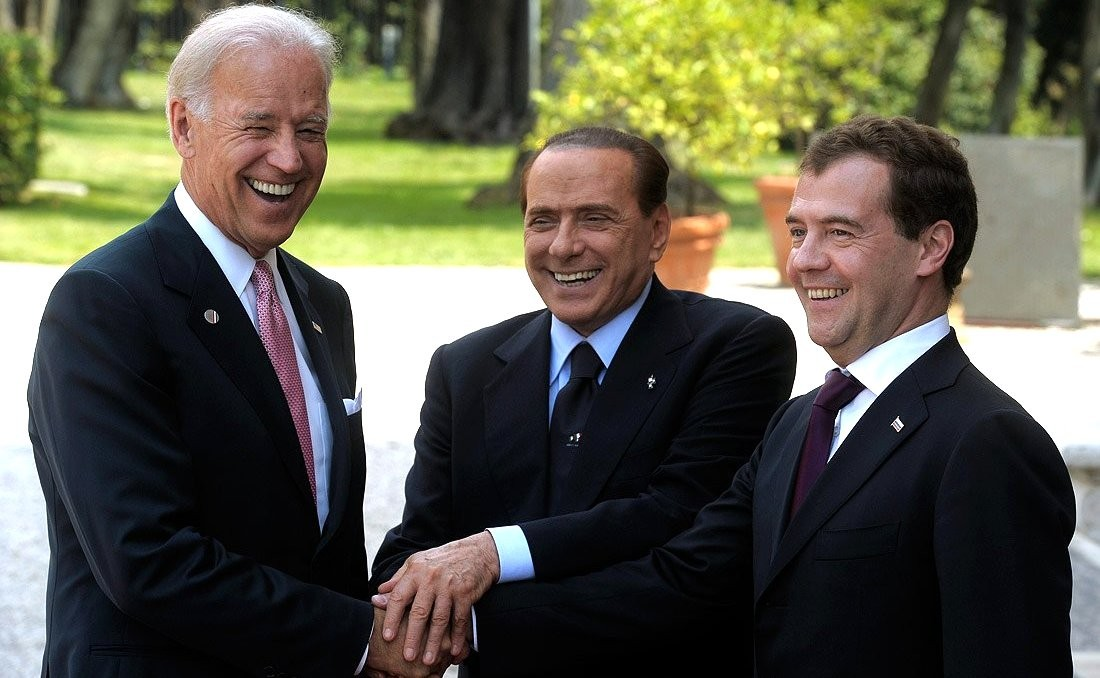
Biden, Russia's president Dmitry Medvedev and Italy's prime minister Silvio Berlusconi meeting in Italy in June 2011

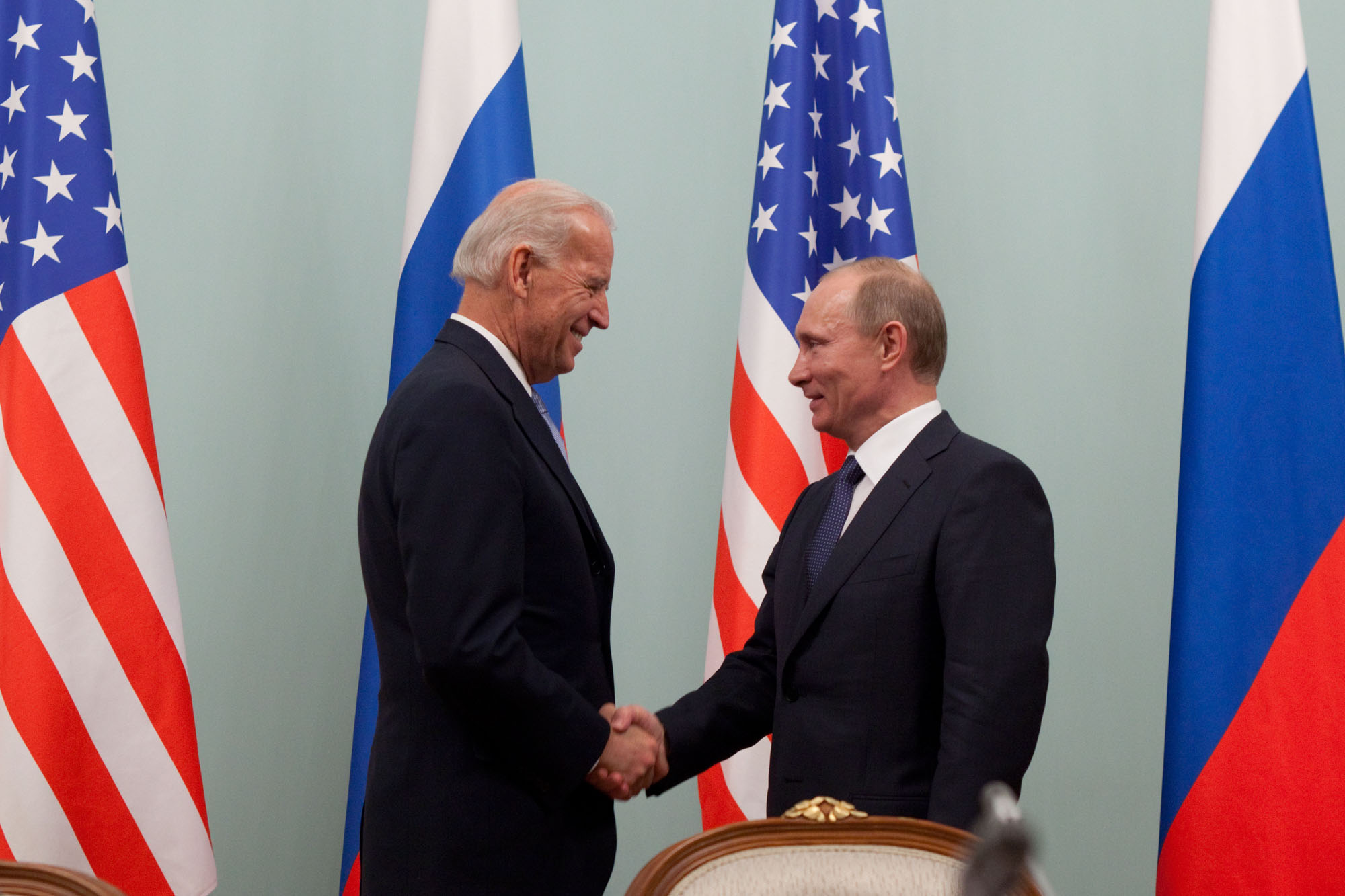
Biden and Vladimir Putin in Moscow, Russia

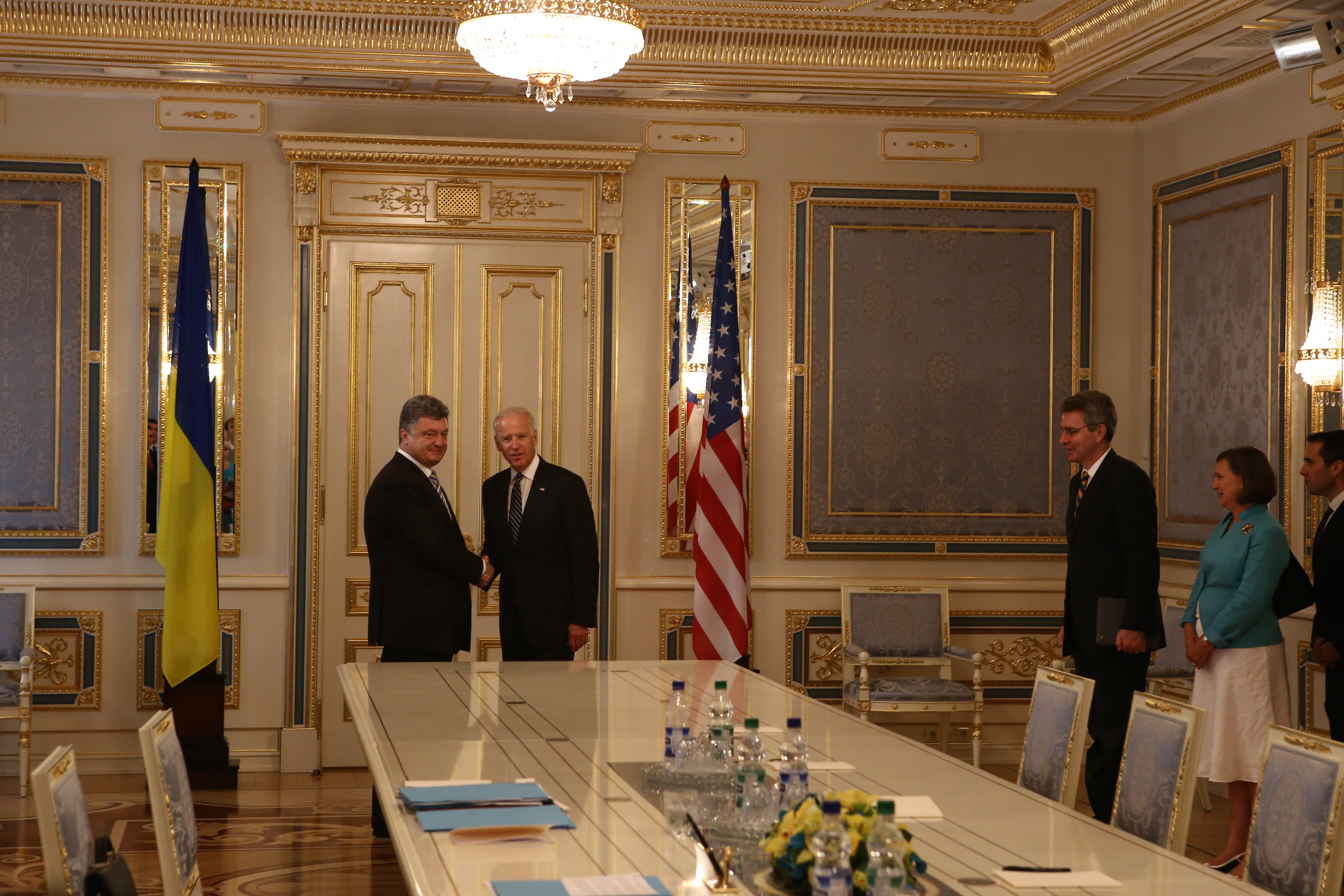
Biden shakes hands with Ukrainian president Petro Poroshenko, June 7, 2014.

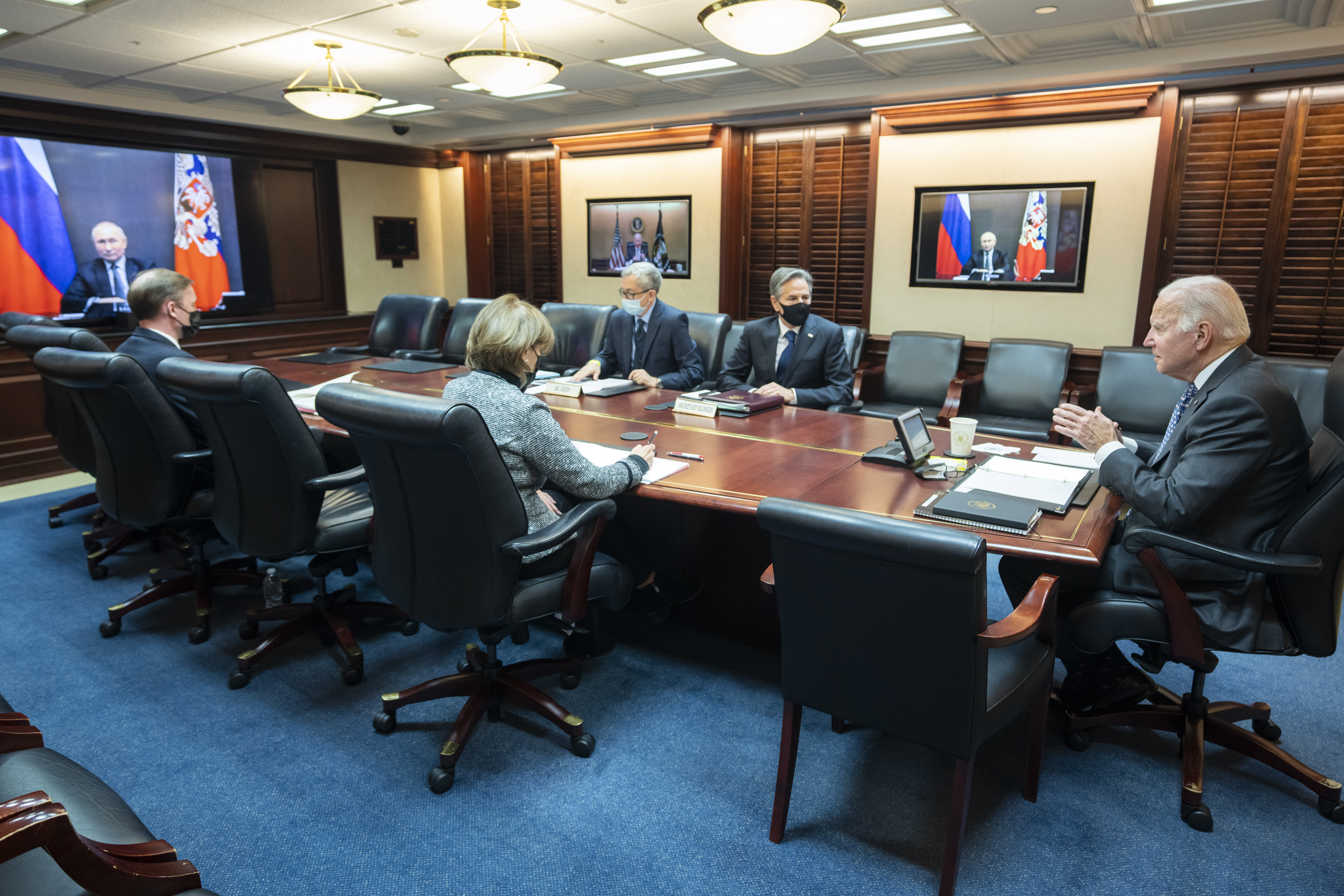
Russian President Vladimir Putin holds a video call with U.S. President Biden on December 7, 2021.

In 1999, Biden cosponsored a draft resolution condemning Russia's military campaign to crush the Chechen Republic of Ichkeria, the use of indiscriminate force by the Russian army against civilians and violations of the Geneva Convention, and urged a peaceful resolution of the conflict.

In 2005, Biden co-sponsored a Senate resolution criticizing Russia for failing to uphold its commitments at the 1999 Organization for Security and Co-operation in Europe (OSCE) Summit, which included agreements on a completed Russian military withdrawal from Moldova's breakaway, pro-Russian region of Transnistria. That resolution also expressed disapproval of Russia's demand for the closure of the OSCE Border Monitoring Operation (BMO), which served to observe border crossings between Georgia and the Russian republics of Chechnya, Dagestan, and Ingushetia. That bill passed in the Senate.

Biden introduced legislation in July 2008 urging members of the Group of Eight to "work toward a more constructive relationship with Russia", and encouraging Russia to behave according to the G-8's "objectives of protecting global security, economic stability, and democracy." The resolution also called on Russian and U.S. leaders to increase cooperation and funding for the Nunn-Lugar program and other nonproliferation initiatives. It also emphasized the need for a successor to the 1991 Strategic Arms Reductions Treaty. The resolution passed.

Biden has voiced concerns about Russia backsliding on democratic reforms. In August 2008, Biden criticized Russia's military action in Georgia in support of South Ossetian separatists. "By acting disproportionately with a full-scale attack on Georgia and seeking the ouster of Georgia's democratically elected president Mikheil Saakashvili, Moscow is jeopardizing its standing in Europe and the broader international community – and risking very real practical and political consequences", Biden wrote in a Financial Times op-ed. Biden urged Russia to abide by the negotiated cease-fire.

Through 2020, Biden and Putin had met once, in Moscow in March 2011. After an official group meeting Biden characterized in his memoir as "argumentative," he and Putin met privately, with Biden saying "Mr. Prime Minister, I'm looking into your eyes," (a reference to a 2001 meeting between Putin and President Bush, who later said "I looked the man in the eye...I was able to get a sense of his soul"). Biden continued, "I don't think you have a soul." Putin replied, "We understand each other."

In a 2018 Foreign Affairs op-ed co-written with Michael Carpenter, Biden described Russia as a kleptocratic, nationalist-populist state that considers Western democracy its existential threat. He acknowledged that the Kremlin launched coordinated attacks across many domains – military, political, economic, informational – against various Western democratic countries, including cyberattacks on the 2016 United States presidential election and 2017 French presidential election. As a result of Russia's threat, Biden supports a "strong response" with cooperation from America's allies and campaign finance reform that will prohibit foreign donations from flowing into domestic elections.

Blockquote|text=Western democracies must also address glaring vulnerabilities in their electoral systems, financial sectors, cyber-infrastructure, and media ecosystems. The U.S. campaign finance system, for example, needs to be reformed to deny foreign actors – from Russia and elsewhere – the ability to interfere in American elections. Authorities can no longer turn a blind eye to the secretive bundling of donations that allows foreign money to flow to U.S. organizations (such as “ghost corporations”) that in turn contribute to super PACs and other putatively independent political organizations, such as trade associations and so-called 501(c)(4) groups. Congress must get serious about campaign finance reform now; doing so should be a matter of bipartisan consensus since this vulnerability affects Democrats and Republicans in equal measure.|sign=Joe Biden, Michael Carpenter|source="How to Stand Up to the Kremlin"

He also condemned Trump for equivocating "on whether Russia interfered in the 2016 election, even after he received briefings from top intelligence officials on precisely how Moscow did it."

At the 2019 Munich Security Conference, Biden reiterated his opposition to Russian interference in elections and their actions against European neighbors, saying, "We have to be explicit in our response and make clear to Russia that there's a price to pay for these transgressions of international norms", and that the U.S. needs to continue to support its NATO allies, as well as Georgia and Ukraine who are not part of NATO, by "establishing virtually continuous air, land and sea presence on NATO's eastern perimeter." He also expressed concerns about Russian influence operations targeting American politics.

On 19 January 2022, President Biden said that he believed Russia would invade Ukraine. Biden said a full-scale invasion of Ukraine would be "the most consequential thing that's happened in the world in terms of war and peace" since World War Two. In January 2022, the Biden administration approved deliveries of U.S.-made Stinger surface-to-air missiles to Ukraine. President Biden was considering deploying up to 50,000 U.S. troops to Eastern Europe. White House National Security Council spokesperson Emily Horne said that "President Biden said that there is a distinct possibility that the Russians could invade Ukraine in February [2022]" Biden and Ukrainian president Volodymyr Zelenskyy disagreed on how imminent the threat was.

After Russia invaded Ukraine he imposed sanctions on Russia and authorized foreign aid and weapons shipments to Ukraine.

=== North America ===
==== Central America ====
As part of the Obama Administration, Biden supported the Central America Regional Security Initiative (CARSI) to combat drug cartels and strengthen law enforcement in Central America. Between 2008 and 2011, the Department of State provided $361.5 million to Central American countries. The State Department stated five main goals to CARSI:

1. Create safe streets for the citizens in the region.
2. Disrupt the movement of criminals and contraband within and between the nations of Central America.
3. Support the development of strong, capable and accountable Central American governments.
4. Re-establish effective state presence and security in communities at risk.
5. Foster enhanced levels of security and rule of law coordination and cooperation between the nations of the region.

When Biden met with Central American leaders in Honduras in 2012, he reiterated the Obama Administration's pledge of $107 million in aid for the region. The Administration would work with Congress to provide the funds under CARSI. These initiatives were part of a larger effort for institutional reform in the region to counter drug trafficking.

During the 2014 Central American child-migrant crisis, Biden supported a $1 billion economic aid package to affected Central American countries. In an op-ed for The New York Times, he wrote, "the security and prosperity of Central America are inextricably linked with our own." He also supported further institutional reforms to combat corruption in those countries, so they can provide their people with safer living conditions.

==== Cuba ====
While in the Senate, Biden voted for the Helms-Burton Act and supported the U.S. embargo against Cuba; in 2006, Biden called for the U.S. to be "putting together a plan as to how we are going to play a positive role in moving that country, after the Castros are gone ... more toward democratization and liberalization." As vice president, Biden supported Obama's Cuban thaw and reestablishment of diplomatic relations with Cuba. Biden stated that the lifting of U.S. trade and travel restrictions removed an "ineffective stumbling block to our bilateral relations with other nations in the hemisphere" and made it easier for the U.S. to engage on issues around human rights.

Biden has criticized Trump's moves to roll back the détente between the U.S. and Cuba, writing in an op-ed in Americas Quarterly that Trump's resumptions of restrictions on travel and commerce harm Cubans seeking "greater independence from the Communist state" and alienate Western Hemisphere allies. Biden also wrote in the Miami Herald that "Trump's...callously limiting the ability of Cuban Americans to reunite with and support their families in Cuba, and the administration's Latin America policy, at best, is a Cold War-era retread and, at worst, at worst, an ineffective mess." During his 2020 presidential campaign, Biden pledged to restore Obama-era U.S. relations with Cuba.

Asked about the 2021 Cuban protests, Biden criticized the "failed state" of Cuba for repressing its citizens and referred to communism, which Cuba follows, as "a universally failed system." The President also described socialism as "not a very good substitute."

== See also ==
- Political positions of Barack Obama
- Political positions of Bernie Sanders
- Political positions of Kamala Harris
- Political positions of Donald Trump
