= War on drugs =

U.S.-led campaign against illegal drug use and trade

- Part of the Illegal drug trade in the United States, the post–Cold War era and the war on terror
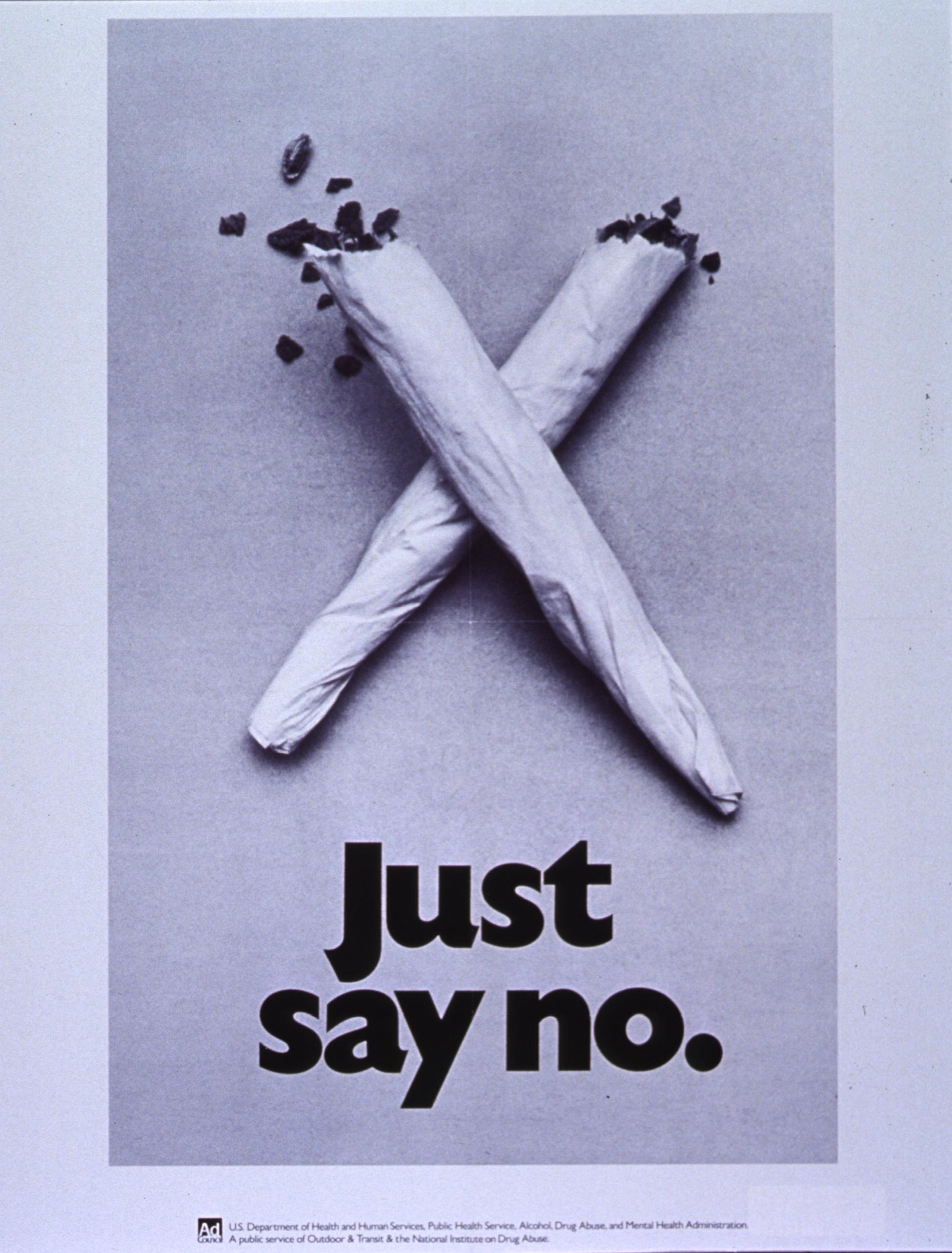
- A U.S. government PSA from the Alcohol, Drug Abuse, and Mental Health Administration with a photo image of two marijuana cigarettes and a "Just Say No" slogan
Date	June 17, 1971–present (55 years, 4 months, 4 weeks and 2 days) (Note: The date marks the announcement by US President Richard Nixon of a broad federal anti-drug initiative, later termed the "war on drugs" in the news media.)
Location	Global
Status	Ongoing

Belligerents
United States; Drug Enforcement Administration; Other allies of the United States including: United Nations; NATO; Mexico; Colombia; Ecuador; El Salvador; Guatemala; Honduras; Peru; Philippines	21st century: Venezuela (2025–present); Cartel of the Suns (alleged by the US) (Note: While the involvement of various Venezuelan government and military officials with drug cartels has been documented, independent experts dispute the existence of an organised cartel run by these officials.); Cartels: Gulf Cartel; Sinaloa Cartel; Juárez Cartel; CJNG; Northeast Cartel (formerly Los Zetas); LNFM; Los Viagras; United Cartels; Gangs: Mara Salvatrucha; Barrio 18; Tren de Aragua; Chone Killers; Los Choneros; Los Lobos; Comando Vermelho; PCC; Paramilitaries and guerrilla groups: National Liberation Army; FARC dissidents (FARC until 2016); Comandos de la Frontera; Gulf Clan (split from AUC); (Afghanistan) Taliban (until 2021); Other organized crime syndicates including paramilities, rebel groups, drug cartels, and drug-trafficking gangs; Italian organized crime: 'Ndrangheta and Camorra; 20th century: Panama (1989–1990); Colombia: Medellín Cartel; Cali Cartel; Mexico: Guadalajara Cartel; Other major drug cartels and drug-trafficking gangs

Commanders and leaders
(United States) Richard Nixon; (United States) Gerald Ford; (United States) Jimmy Carter; (United States) Ronald Reagan; (United States) George H. W. Bush; (United States) Bill Clinton; (United States) George W. Bush; (United States) Barack Obama; (United States) Donald Trump; (United States) Joe Biden; DEA Administrators: John R. Bartels Jr.; Peter B. Bensinger; Francis M. Mullen; John C. Lawn; Robert C. Bonner; Thomas A. Constantine; Donnie R. Marshall; Asa Hutchinson; Karen Tandy; Michele Leonhart; Anne Milgram; Terry Cole	(Venezuela) Nicolás Maduro (POW); Osiel Cárdenas Guillén (surrendered); Antonio Cárdenas Guillén X; Jorge Eduardo Costilla Sánchez (surrendered); El Chapo (surrendered); El Mayo (surrendered); El Alfredillo; El Chapito; El Mencho †; (Panama) Manuel Noriega (surrendered); Pablo Escobar X; Gilberto Rodríguez Orejuela (surrendered); Miguel Rodríguez Orejuela (surrendered); Miguel Ángel Félix Gallardo (surrendered); Rafael Caro Quintero (surrendered)

The war on drugs is a global anti-narcotics campaign led by the United States federal government, including drug prohibition and foreign assistance, with the aim of reducing the illegal drug trade in the US. The initiative's efforts includes policies intended to discourage the production, distribution, and consumption of psychoactive drugs that the participating governments, through United Nations treaties, have made illegal.

The term "war on drugs" was popularized by the media after a press conference, given on June 17, 1971, during which President Richard Nixon declared drug abuse "public enemy number one". Earlier that day, Nixon had presented a special message to the US Congress on "Drug Abuse Prevention and Control", which included text about devoting more federal resources to the "prevention of new addicts, and the rehabilitation of those who are addicted"; that aspect did not receive the same media attention as the term "war on drugs".

In the years since, presidential administrations and Congress have generally maintained or expanded Nixon's original initiatives, with the emphasis on law enforcement and interdiction over public health and treatment. Cannabis presents a special case; it came under federal restriction in the 1930s, and since 1970 has been classified as having a high potential for abuse and no medical value, with the same level of prohibition as heroin. Multiple mainstream studies and findings since the 1930s have recommended against such a severe classification. Beginning in the 1990s, cannabis has been legalized for medical use in 39 states, and also for recreational use in 24, creating a policy gap with federal law and non-compliance with the UN drug treaties.

In June 2011, the Global Commission on Drug Policy released a critical report, declaring: "The global war on drugs has failed, with devastating consequences for individuals and societies around the world." In 2023, the UN High Commissioner for Human Rights stated that "decades of punitive, 'war on drugs' strategies had failed to prevent an increasing range and quantity of substances from being produced and consumed." That year, the annual US federal drug war budget reached $39 billion, with cumulative spending since 1971 estimated at $1 trillion.

Addressing the US Congress on March 4, 2025, President Donald Trump announced, "It’s time for America to wage war on the cartels," as his administration pursued a militarized strategy against Latin American drug cartels. On January 3, 2026, the United States launched a large-scale military operation (Operation Absolute Resolve), capturing Venezuelan President Nicolas Maduro and his wife, Cilia Flores, who face federal charges (United States v. Carvajal-Barrios) including narcoterrorism and cocaine trafficking.

== History ==
Drugs in the US remained largely unregulated until federal laws arrived in the early 20th century. Opium had been used to relieve pain since the Revolutionary War. Civilian use of opiates and cocaine surged in the late 1800s. Alcohol consumption grew alongside the temperance movement. Cannabis was noticed in the early 1900s. While state and local laws date back to the mid-1800s, the US Constitution grants drug control authority at both the federal and state level.

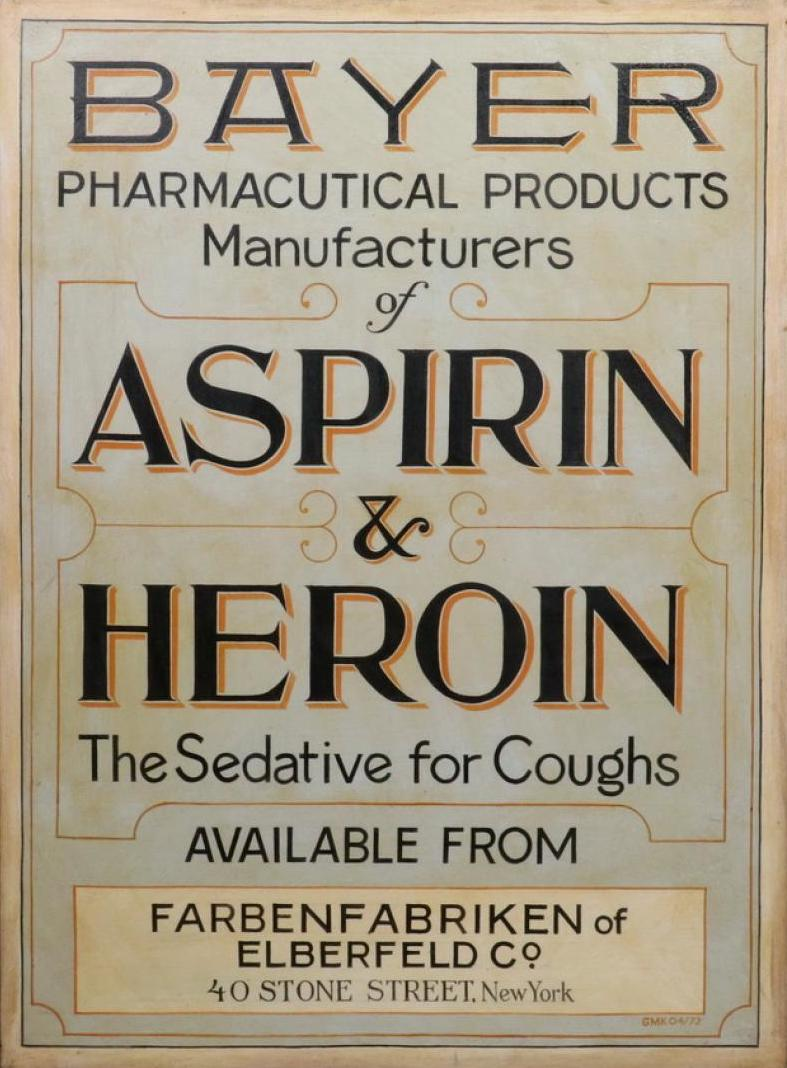
Advertising sign from Bayer for use in US drug stores, dating from before the federal prohibition of heroin by the Anti-Heroin Act of 1924.

=== 1800s – America's "first opioid crisis" ===
The 1880s saw opiate addiction surge among housewives, doctors, and Civil War veterans, creating America's "first opioid crisis". By the end of the century, an estimated one in 200 Americans were addicted, with a majority of mostly affluent white women. Rapid medical advances led to better treatments, and prescribed opiate use declined. Opium smoking among thousands of Chinese immigrant Chinese laborers began to change the image of the opium user, from well-to-do white Americans, to "Chinese, gamblers, and prostitutes".

During this period, states and municipalities began enacting laws banning or regulating certain drugs. In 1875, San Francisco enacted a vigorously enforced anti-opium ordinance, imposing stiff fines and jail for visiting opium dens. The law was ultimately aimed at the Chinese laborer population accused of taking jobs. Similar laws were enacted in other states and cities, and the federal government became involved, raising the import tariff on the smoking grade of opium. These measures proved largely ineffective. Meanwhile, opioids, cocaine, and cannabis came to be associated with ethnic minorities.

=== 1900–1971: Rise of federal drug prohibition ===
Drug regulation and restriction grew rapidly in the first part of the new century. In 1906, the Pure Food and Drug Act required the listing of active ingredients on medications, specifically named opium, morphine, heroin, cocaine, and cannabis were deemed addictive or dangerous, and assigned oversight to the US Department of Agriculture's Bureau of Chemistry (the Food and Drug Administration as of1930). On February 9, 1909, the Smoking Opium Exclusion Act, became the first US federal law to ban the importation and use of a drug for non-medical purposes, soon followed by the Harrison Narcotics Tax Act of 1914, to regulate and tax opiates and coca products.

During World War I (1914–1918), military use of opiates for pain and cocaine for performance enhancement, and concern over abuse, led to the adoption of the International Opium Convention, incorporated into the Treaty of Versailles in 1919. The convention regulated the drug trade without affecting production or use, and became the basis of current international drug control policy —a strongly prohibitionist US felt the provisions were not sufficiently restrictive.

In 1919, the 18th Amendment and the National Prohibition Act (the Volstead Act) banned alcohol for recreational use. Prohibition soon proved to be a failure as consumption rose, crime and the black market flourished, and tax revenue was lost. In 1933, amidst the Great Depression, the ban ended with the 21st Amendment—President Franklin D. Roosevelt (1933–1945) asked Americans not to abuse "this return to personal freedom." Meanwhile, in 1922, the Narcotic Drugs Import and Export Act broadened federal regulation of opiates and coca products by prohibiting import and export for non-medical use.

==== Anslinger era begins ====
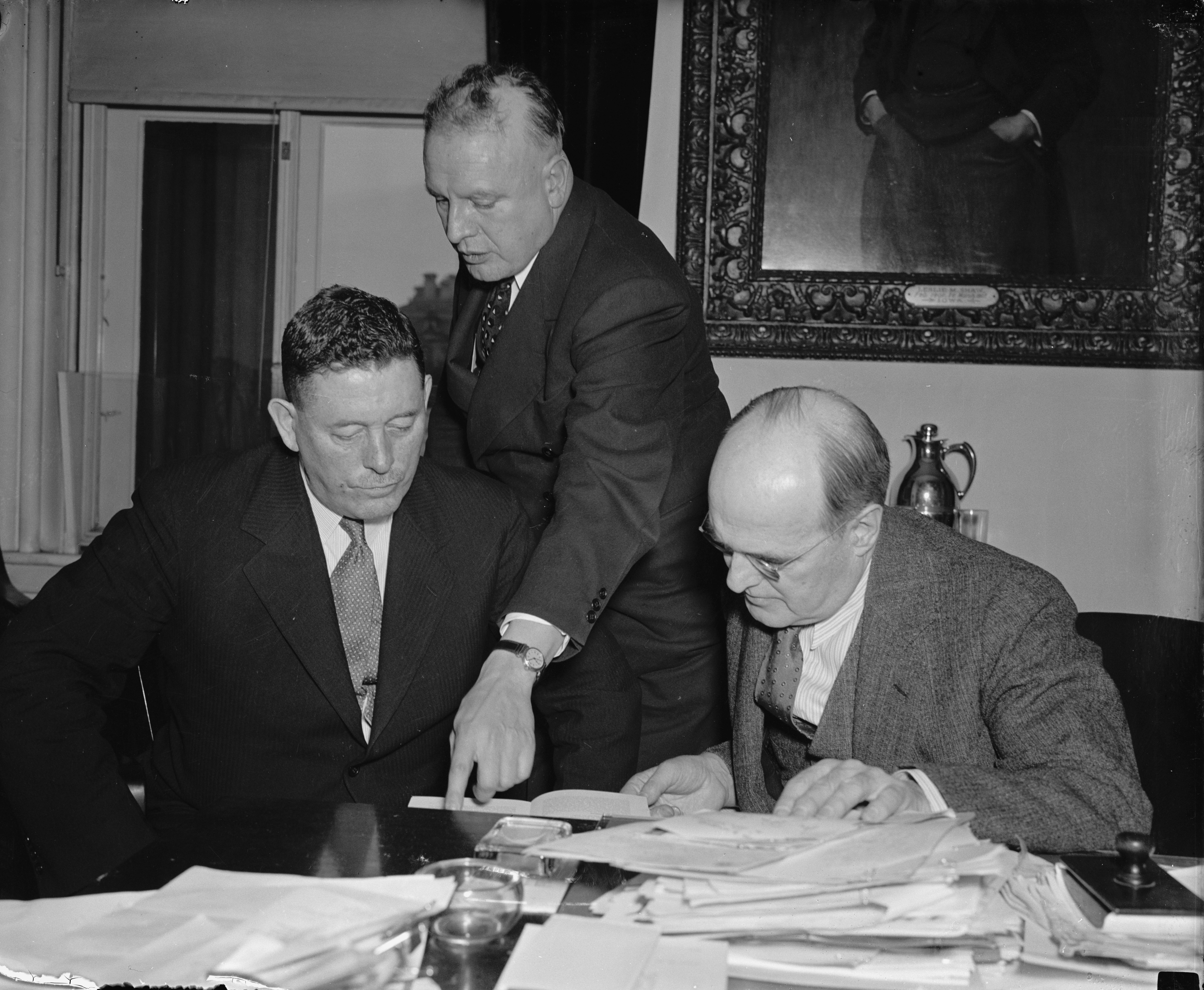
Anslinger (center) discussing cannabis control with Canadian narcotics chief Charles Henry Ludovic Sharman and Assistant Secretary of the Treasury Stephen B. Gibbons (1938)

The Federal Bureau of Narcotics (FBN) was established by the US Department of the Treasury on June 14, 1930, with Harry J. Anslinger as commissioner, a position he held for 32 years, until 1962. Anslinger supported Prohibition and the criminalization of all drugs, and spearheaded anti-drug policy campaigns, urging courts to "jail offenders, then throw away the key." He has been characterized as the first architect of the punitive war on drugs.

Anslinger's zealous pursuit of harsh drug penalties focused particularly on cannabis. He drafted legislation, discredited critics, discounted medical opinion and scientific findings, and convinced lawmakers. Publicly, he used the media and speaking engagements to promote the evils of drug use, announcing that youth become addicted to cannabis and "deteriorate mentally, become insane, turn to violent crime and murder." He presented a racialized view of drug use, where blacks and Latinos were the primary abusers. He testified before Congress that narcotic addicts were the leading perpetrators of crime. He was also an effective administrator and diplomat, attending international drug conferences and steadily expanding the FBN's influence.

In 1935, the New York Times headlined President Roosevelt's public support of the Uniform State Narcotic Drug Act as, "Roosevelt Asks Narcotic War Aid". The act created a model law reflecting the Harrison Act that states could adopt to replace the existing patchwork of state laws. Anslinger and the FBN were centrally involved in drafting the act, and in convincing states to adopt it.

==== Cannabis effectively outlawed, prescription drugs ====
By 1936, the non-medical use of cannabis had been banned in every state. With the passage of the Marihuana Tax Act of 1937, federal taxation effectively did the same. An arrest for tax non-payment for possession of a quarter-ounce (7g) of cannabis resulted in nearly 18 months sentence. The American Medical Association (AMA) had opposed the tax act on grounds that it unduly affected the medical use of cannabis, and that the claims about addiction, violence and overdoses were not supported by evidence.

In 1939, New York City Mayor Fiorello LaGuardia, an opponent of the Marihuana Tax Act, initiated the first US in-depth study of cannabis use. The report, produced by the New York Academy of Medicine, contradicted government claims, finding that cannabis is not physically addictive, and doesn't lead to other drugs or to crime. The FBN's Anslinger branded the study "unscientific" and denounced all involved.

In the late 1930s, the League of Nations' Opium Advisory Committee questioned the focus on drug prohibition over public health measures. Anslinger, backed by his Canadian counterpart and policy ally, Charles Henry Ludovic Sharman, successfully argued against this view, and kept the focus on increasing global prohibition and supply control measures.

In 1938, the Federal Food, Drug, and Cosmetic Act required that non-narcotic drugs were labeled for safe use. The FDA determined that certain drugs, including amphetamines and barbiturates, were unsafe without medical supervision and could only be obtained by doctor's prescription. This marked the beginning of the federal distinction between over-the-counter and prescription drugs (made law in the Durham–Humphrey Amendment of 1951).

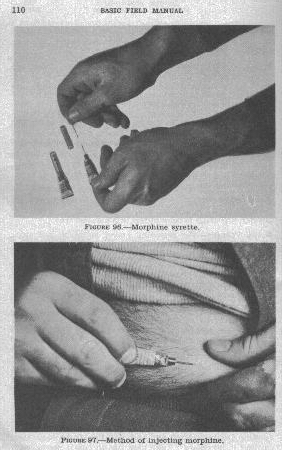
"For the relief of severe pain": WWII US Army first aid manual illustrating self-injection of morphine using a syrette.

==== Amphetamines, harsher penalties, international obligations ====
World War II (1939–1945) saw widespread use of morphine, and the use of amphetamines to combat fatigue and improve morale. In the US, the Benzedrine brand, widely used in the military, became popular in the public for medical and recreational applications. Post-war, amphetamines were promoted as mood elevators and diet pills to great success; by 1945, an estimated 750 million tablets a year were being produced in the US, and production increased during the 1950s and 1960s.

After the war, the League of Nations ended and transferred responsibilities to its successor, the United Nations. Anslinger, supported by Sharman, successfully campaigned to ensure that law enforcement and the prohibitionist view remained central to international drug policy. With the 1946 Lake Success Protocol, he helped to make sure that law enforcement was represented on the UN's new drug policy Supervisory Body (today's International Narcotics Control Board), and that it did not fall under a public health-oriented agency like the WHO.

In the early 1950s, responding to "white suburban grassroots movements" concerned about teenagers, liberal politicians at state level cracked down on drugs. California, Illinois, and New York passed the first mandatory minimum sentences for drug offenses; Congress followed with the Boggs Act of 1951, creating the first federal mandatory minimums for drugs. The act unified penalties for the Narcotic Drugs Import and Export Act and the Marihuana Tax Act, effectively criminalizing cannabis. Anslinger testified in favor of the inclusion of cannabis. First-offense possession of cannabis carried a 2–10-year minimum and a fine of up to $20,000.

In 1961, the Single Convention on Narcotic Drugs became the first of three UN treaties that together form the legal framework for international drug control. The Single Convention unified existing international drug agreements, and limited possession and use of opiates, cannabis and cocaine to "medicinal and scientific purposes". It came into force in the US in 1967. The Convention on Psychotropic Substances of 1971 added synthetic, prescription and hallucinogenic drugs. The United Nations Convention Against Illicit Traffic in Narcotic Drugs and Psychotropic Substances of 1988 addressed international drug trafficking and in effect criminalized the entire illicit drug market chain.

In 1968, President Lyndon B. Johnson (1963–69) moved to curtail the social unrest that blanketed the country at the time. He focused on illegal drug use, following expert opinion that drugs were the root of much of crime His Reorganization Plan of 1968 merged the Bureau of Narcotics and the Bureau of Drug Abuse Control to form the Bureau of Narcotics and Dangerous Drugs within the Department of Justice.

==== Federal drug schedule system introduced ====
The Richard Nixon presidency (1969–74) incorporated his predecessor's anti-drug initiative in a tough-on-crime platform. In a 1969 special message to Congress, he identified drug abuse as "a serious national threat".

On October 27, 1970, Nixon signed into law the Comprehensive Drug Abuse Prevention and Control Act of 1970, establishing his approach to drug control. The act largely repealed mandatory minimum sentences: simple possession was reduced to a misdemeanor, while trafficking penalties were increased, up to life in prison. Funding was authorized for the Department of Health, Education and Welfare to provide treatment, rehabilitation and education, and for additional federal drug agents. Title II of Act, the Controlled Substances Act (CSA), helped align US law with the UN Single Convention—the CSA's five drug Schedules, an implementation of the Single Convention's four schedule system, categorized drugs based on medical value and potential for abuse.

Under the new drug schedules, cannabis was provisionally placed by the administration in the most restrictive Schedule I, "until the completion of certain studies now underway to resolve the issue." As mandated by the CSA, Nixon appointed the National Commission on Marijuana and Drug Abuse, known as the Shafer Commission, to investigate.

=== 1971–present: the "war on drugs" ===
On May 27, 1971, two congressmen, Morgan F. Murphy (Democrat) and Robert H. Steele (Republican), released a report based on their trip to Vietnam, describing a "a rapid increase in heroin addiction" among US troops in South Vietnam. On June 6, the New York times cited the Murphy-Steele report in a discussion of heroin addiction, and called out amphetamine addiction in the American suburbs—the housewife to cure her "blues", the husband for his weight—as a comparable problem.

On June 17, 1971, Nixon presented to Congress a plan for expanded anti-drug abuse measures. He painted a dire picture: "The problem has assumed the dimensions of a national emergency. ... If we cannot destroy the drug menace in America, then it will surely in time destroy us." His strategy involved both treatment and interdiction, asking for funds for treatment and rehabilitation, and for law enforcement. He singled out heroin and broadened the scope beyond the US, calling for international cooperation.

Later that day, Nixon held a White House news conference where he described drug abuse as "America's public enemy number one." He announced, "In order to fight and defeat this enemy, it is necessary to wage a new, all-out offensive. ... This will be a worldwide offensive dealing with the problems of sources of supply." Nixon also stated that the problem wouldn't end with the addiction of soldiers in the Vietnam War. He pledged to ask Congress for a minimum of $350 million for the anti-drug effort (when he took office in 1969, the federal drug budget was $81 million).

The news media focused on Nixon's militaristic tone, describing his announcement with variations of the phrase "war on drugs". The day after Nixon's press conference, the Chicago Tribune proclaimed, "Nixon Declares War on Narcotics Use in US". In England, The Guardian headlined, "Nixon declares war on drug addicts." The US anti-drug campaign came to be commonly referred to as the war on drugs; the term also became used to refer to any government's prosecution of a US-style prohibition-based drug policy.

Facing reelection, with drug control as a campaign centerpiece, Nixon formed the Office of Drug Abuse Law Enforcement (ODALE) in late 1971. ODALE, armed with new federal enforcement powers, began orchestrating drug raids nationwide. From 1972 to 1973, ODALE performed 6,000 drug arrests in 18 months, the majority of the arrested black.

In 1972, the Shafer Commission released its report, "Marihuana: A Signal of Misunderstanding", comprising a review of the medical literature and a national drug survey. It recommended decriminalization for personal possession and use of small amounts of cannabis, and prohibition only of supply. The conclusion was not acted on by Nixon or by Congress. Citing the Shafer report, a lobbying campaign from 1973 to 1978, spearheaded by the National Organization for the Reform of Marijuana Laws (NORML), convinced 11 states to decriminalize cannabis for personal use.

In 1973, Nixon created the Drug Enforcement Administration (DEA) by an executive order accepted by Congress, to "establish a single unified command to combat an all-out global war on the drug menace." The agency was charged with enforcing US controlled substances laws and regulations nationally and internationally, coordinating with federal, state and local agencies and foreign governments, and overseeing legally produced controlled substances. The DEA absorbed the Bureau of Narcotics and Dangerous Drugs, ODALE, and other drug-related federal agencies or personnel from them.

==== Nixon's role reviewed ====
Decades later, a controversial quote attributed to John Ehrlichman, Nixon's domestic policy advisor, claimed that the war on drugs was fabricated: "... Did we know we were lying about the drugs? Of course we did." The 2016 Harper's cover story by journalist Dan Baum retrieved the quote from his 1994 interview notes. Ehrlichman died in 1999. The veracity of the quote was challenged by Ehrlichman's children, and Nixon-era officials. In the end, the increasingly punitive reshaping of US drug policy by later administrations was most responsible for creating some of the conditions Ehrlichman described.

In a 2011 commentary, Robert DuPont, Nixon's drug czar, argued that the Comprehensive Drug Abuse Act had represented a degree of drug reform. He noted that the act had rolled back mandatory minimum sentencing and launched an "entirely new and massive commitment to prevention, intervention and treatment.' Thus it could be said, Nixon was not in fact the originator of what came to be called the "war on drugs". During Nixon's term, some 70% of federal anti-drug money was spent on demand-side public health measures, and 30% on supply-side interdiction and punishment, a funding ratio not repeated under subsequent administrations.

The war on drugs under the next two presidents, Gerald Ford (1974–77) and Jimmy Carter (1977–81), was essentially a continuation of their predecessors' policies. Carter's campaign platform included decriminalization of cannabis and an end to federal penalties for possession of up to one ounce, but his advocacy was not translated into law.

==== Reagan escalation, militarization, and "Just Say No" ====
The presidency of Ronald Reagan (1981–89) saw a significant increase in federal focus on drug interdiction and prosecution. Shortly after his inauguration, Reagan announced, "We're taking down the surrender flag that has flown over so many drug efforts; we're running up a battle flag." From 1980 to 1984, the annual budget of the Federal Bureau of Investigation (FBI) drug enforcement units went from $8 million to $95 million. In 1982, Vice President George H. W. Bush and his aides began pushing for the involvement of the Central Intelligence Agency (CIA) and the US military in drug interdiction efforts.

Through the 1980s, First Lady Nancy Reagan tirelessly promoted her youth-oriented "Just Say No" anti-drug campaign. Later research indicated it had little or no impact on youth drug use, while public perception of drug abuse as America's most serious problem, in the 2–6% range in 1985, rose to 64% in 1989.

In January 1982, Reagan established the South Florida Task Force, chaired by Bush, targeting a surge of cocaine and cannabis entering through the Miami region, and the sharp rise in related crime. The project involved the DEA, the FBI and other agencies, and Armed Forces ships and planes. It was called the "most ambitious and expensive drug enforcement operation" in US history; critics called it an election year political stunt. By 1986, the task force had made over 15,000 arrests and seized over six million pounds of cannabis and 100,000 pounds of cocaine, while cocaine imports increased by 10%.

In 1984, Reagan signed the Comprehensive Crime Control Act, which included harsher penalties for cannabis cultivation, possession, and distribution. It also established equitable sharing, a new civil asset forfeiture program that allowed state and local law enforcement to share the proceeds from asset seizures made in collaboration with federal agencies. Under the controversial program, up to 80% of seizure proceeds can go to local law enforcement budgets. By 2019, $36.5 billion worth of assets had been seized, much of it drug-related.

==== Crackdown on crack ====
As the media focused on the emergence of crack cocaine in the early 1980s, the Reagan administration shored up negative public opinion, encouraging the DEA to emphasize the harmful effects of the drug. Stories of "crack whores" and "crack babies" became commonplace. In mid-1986, the cocaine overdose deaths of rising basketball star Len Bias, and young NFL football player Don Rogers, both in June, received wide coverage. Riding the wave of public fervor, that October Reagan signed into law much harsher sentencing for crack through the Anti-Drug Abuse Act, commonly known as the Len Bias law. According to historian Elizabeth Hinton, the legislation disproportionately targeted the black crack users, while ignoring a similar problem with crystallized methamphetamine among low-income white Americans".

The Anti-Drug Abuse Act appropriated an additional $1.7 billion to drug war funding, and established 29 new mandatory minimum sentences for drug offenses. Of particular note, the act made sentences for larger amounts of cocaine 100 times more severe for crack than for the powder form; pharmacologically, there is no difference between the two. Debate at the time considered whether crack, generally used by black Americans, was more addictive than the powder form, generally used by whites, comparing the effects of snorting powder cocaine with the briefer, more intense high from smoking crack;

Support for Reagan's drug crime legislation was bipartisan. According to historian Hinton, Democrats supported drug legislation as they had since the Johnson administration, though Reagan was a Republican.

Internationally, military anti-drug activity in other countries increased the Department of Defense budget for interdiction rising from $4.9 million in 1982 to $397 million by 1987. The DEA also expanded its foreign presence. The threat of US economic sanctions was used to encourage other countries to adopt a US-style war on drugs approach. for non-compliance.

By the end of Reagan's presidency in 1989, illicit drugs were more readily available and cheaper than at the start of his first term in 1981.

==== Hard line maintained and a new opioid crisis ====
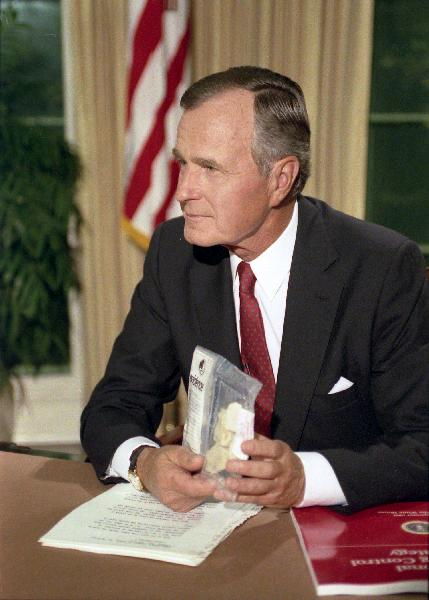
President George H. W. Bush holds up a bag of crack cocaine during his Address to the Nation on National Drug Control Strategy on September 5, 1989.

As president, Reagan protégé and former VP George H. W. Bush (1989–93) maintained the hard line drawn by his predecessor. In his first prime time address to the nation, Bush held up a plastic bag of crack "seized a few days ago in a park across the street from the White House". The first National Drug Control Strategy was issued by the Office of National Drug Control Policy (ONDCP) in 1989—ONDCP became commonly known as the US drug czar. In the National Defense Authorization Act for 1990–91, Congress included the 1208 Program, allowing the defense department to transfer surplus military equipment "suitable for use in counter-drug activities", to local law enforcement agencies.

As president, Bill Clinton (1993–2001), seeking to reposition the Democratic Party as tough on crime, signed the Violent Crime Control and Law Enforcement Act of 1994, introducing a federal "three-strikes" provision that mandated life imprisonment for violent offenders with two prior convictions for violent crimes or drugs. Billions of dollars in funding for states to expand their prison systems and increase law enforcement. During this period, state and local governments initiated controversial drug policies that demonstrated racial biases, such as the stop-and-frisk police practice in New York City, and state-level "three strikes" felony laws, which began with California in 1994.

During the 1990s, a dramatic rise in opioid use in the US dramatically led to the ongoing situation commonly called the opioid epidemic. A critical point in the development of the epidemic was the release and aggressive marketing in 1996 of OxyContin (oxicodone) by Purdue Pharma, and subsequent deceptive opioid marketing efforts by pharma companies, conducted without sufficient official oversight. The DEA initially targeted doctors, pharmacists, pill mills, and pharmaceutical companies. As law enforcement cracked down on the pharmaceutical supply, illicit drug trafficking in opioids grew to meet demand.

The George W. Bush (2001–2009) administration maintained the hard line approach. In a TV interview in February 2001, Bush's new attorney general, John Ashcroft, said about the war on drugs, "I want to renew it. I want to refresh it, relaunch it if you will." In 2001, after 9/11 and the Patriot Act, the DEA began highlighting the tie between drug trafficking and international terrorism, gaining the agency expanded funding to increase its global presence.

==== Growing dissent ====
The US incarceration rate peaked in 2008. The US rate was the highest in the world in 2008. Chart is for prisoners per 100,000 population of all ages.

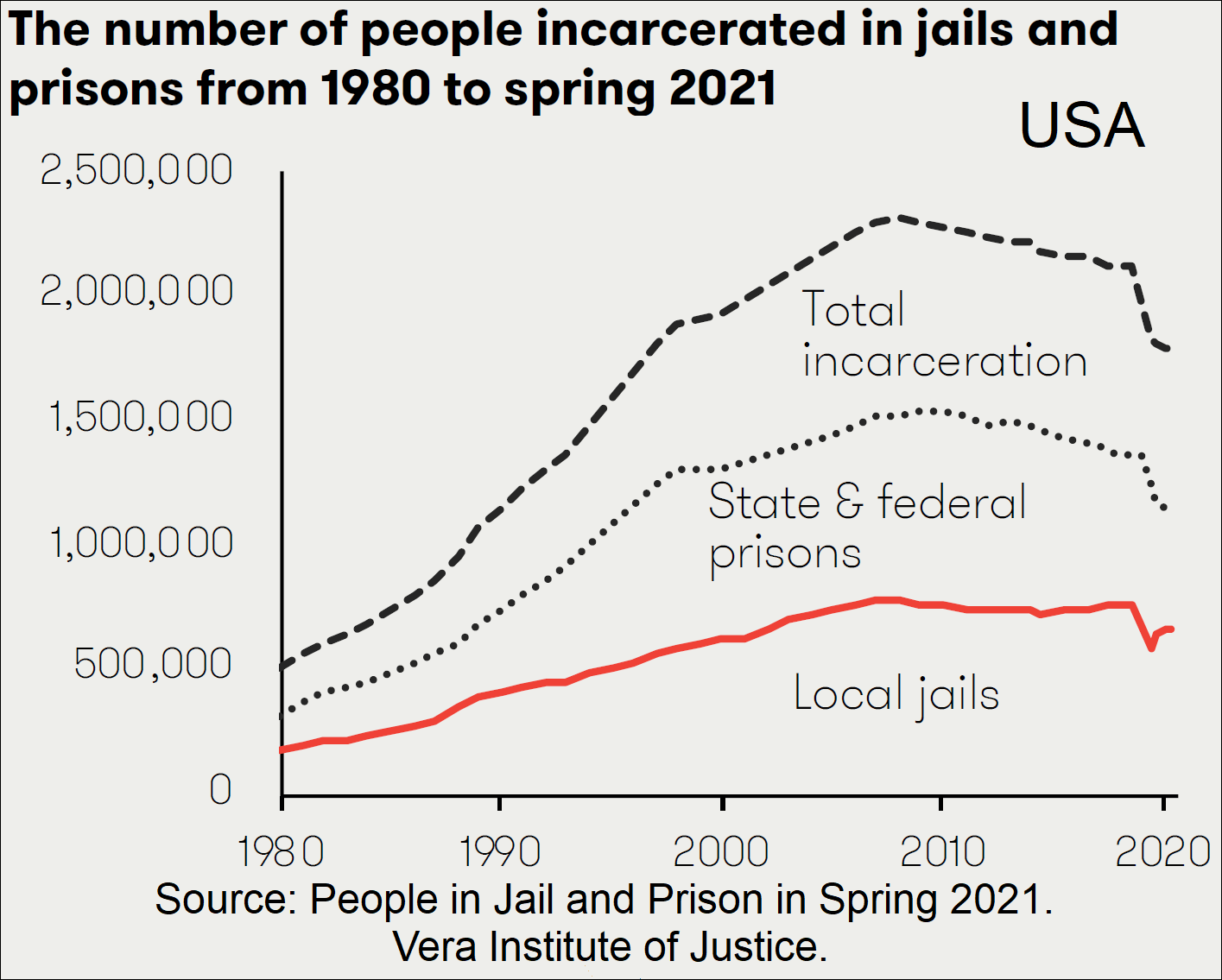
US timeline graphs of number of people incarcerated in jails and prisons

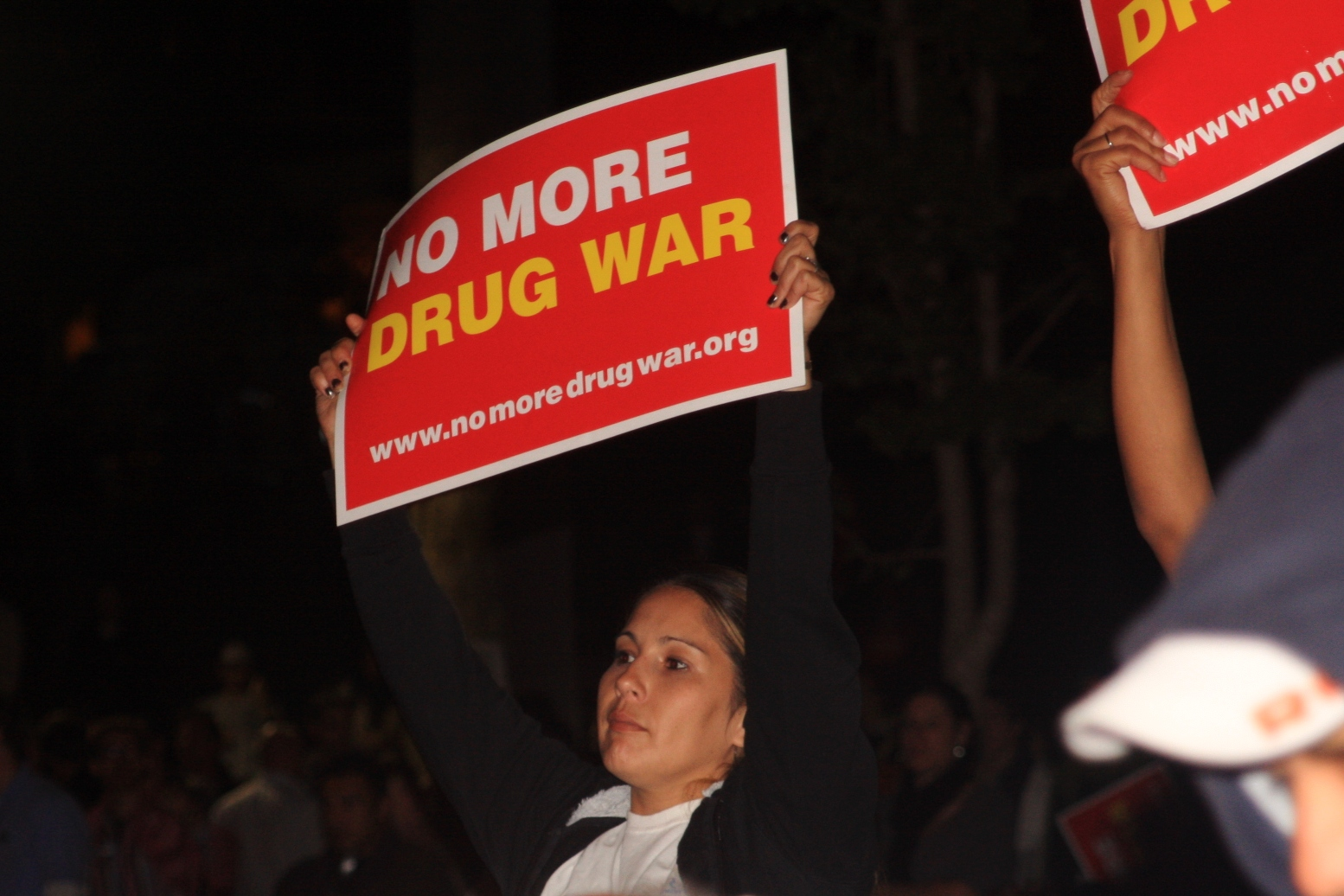
Anti-war on drugs protest in Los Angeles, 2011.

In mid-2001, a report by the American Civil Liberties Union (ACLU), "The Drug War is the New Jim Crow", tied disproportionate rate of African American incarceration to the rights lost once convicted. Blacks were 13.4 times likely to be incarcerated than whites, while use in both groups was about the same. Between federal and state laws, even a simple possession conviction could mean losses of the right to vote, eligibility for educational assistance including loans and work-study programs, custody of children, and personal property including homes. The report called the cumulative effect of the war on drugs "the US apartheid, the new Jim Crow". This view was further developed by lawyer and civil rights advocate Michelle Alexander in her 2010 book, The New Jim Crow: Mass Incarceration in the Age of Colorblindness.

In the year 2000, the US drug-control budget reached $18.4 billion, nearly half of which was spent financing law enforcement while only one-sixth was spent on treatment. In the year 2003, 53% of the requested drug control budget was for enforcement, 29% for treatment, and 18% for prevention.

President Barack Obama (2009–2017) implemented a "tough but smart" approach to the war on drugs that in practice changed little. In May 2009, Gil Kerlikowske, Director of the ONDCP – the drug czar – indicated that the Obama administration did not plan to significantly alter drug enforcement policy, but that it would not use the term "war on drugs", considering it to be "counter-productive". In August 2010, the Fair Sentencing Act reduced the 100:1 sentencing disparity between crack and powder cocaine to 18:1 for pending and future cases. In 2013, the Justice Department issued the Cole Memo, stating that it would defer to state cannabis laws provided strict regulation was maintained.

In 2011, the Global Commission on Drug Policy, an international non-governmental group composed primarily of former heads of state and government, and leaders from various sectors, released a report that stated, "The global war on drugs has failed." Obama's ONDCP did not support the report.

==== International divisions, state-level changes ====
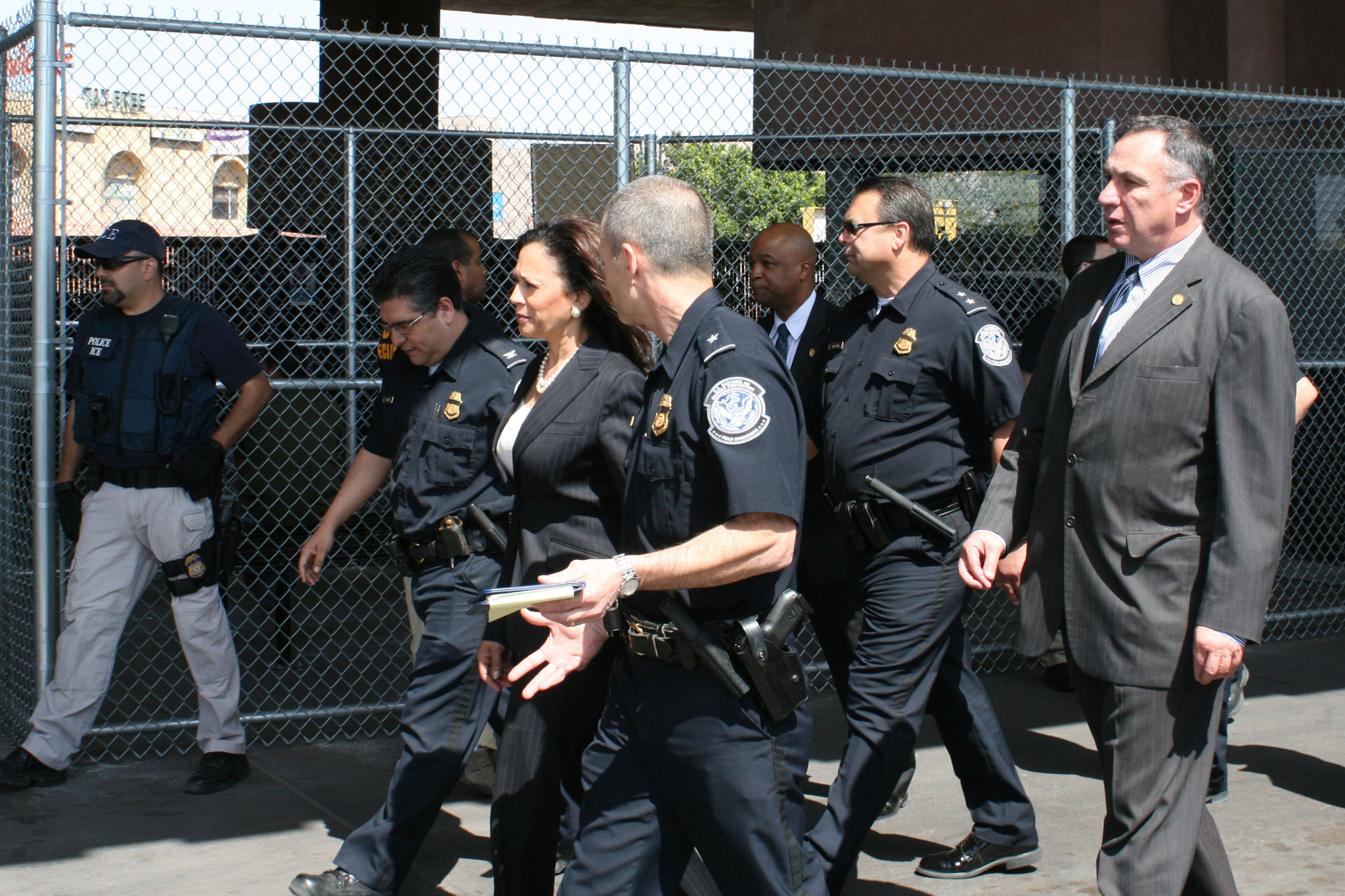
California Attorney General Kamala Harris visiting the U.S.–Mexico border on March 24, 2011, to discuss strategies to combat drug cartels

In May 2012, the ONDCP published "Principles of Modern Drug Policy", broadly focusing on public health, human rights, and criminal justice reform, while targeting drug traffickers. ONDCP director Kerlikowske stated that drug legalization is not the solution to drug control, and success is not measured by the number of arrests mae. That month, Italy, Russia, Sweden, the United Kingdom and the US issued a joint statement, "For a humane and balanced drug policy", promoting both drug restriction and demand reduction and treatment." At the state level, 2012 saw Colorado and Washington become the first two states to legalize the recreational use of cannabis with the passage of Amendment 64 and Initiative 502 respectively.

A 2013 ACLU report declared the anti-cannabis crusade a "war on people of color". Under Obama's policies, nonwhite drug offenders received less excessive criminal sanctions, but by examining criminals as strictly violent or nonviolent, mass incarceration persisted.

In March 2016, the International Narcotics Control Board stated that the UN's international drug treaties do not mandate a "war on drugs" and that the choice is not between "'militarized' drug law enforcement on one hand and the legalization of non-medical use of drugs on the other", health and welfare should be the focus of drug policy. That April, the UN General Assembly Special Session (UNGASS) on the "World Drug Problem" was held. The Wall Street Journal assessed the attendees' positions as roughly in two camps, favoring or strongly opposing softer drug measures. The outcome document recommended treatment, prevention and other public health measures, and committed to intensifying efforts against drug production and trafficking.

Under President Donald Trump (2017–2021), Attorney General Jeff Sessions riscinded the Cole Memo that allowed states to sell cannabis. He instructed federal prosecutors to "charge and pursue the most serious, readily provable offense" in drug cases, regardless of whether mandatory minimum sentences applied, which included lower-level charges. With cannabis legalized to some degree in over 30 states, Sessions' directive was seen by both Democrats and Republicans as a rogue throwback action, and there was a bipartisan outcry. Trump fired Sessions in 2018 over other issues.

==== Some policy reversal attempts and successes ====
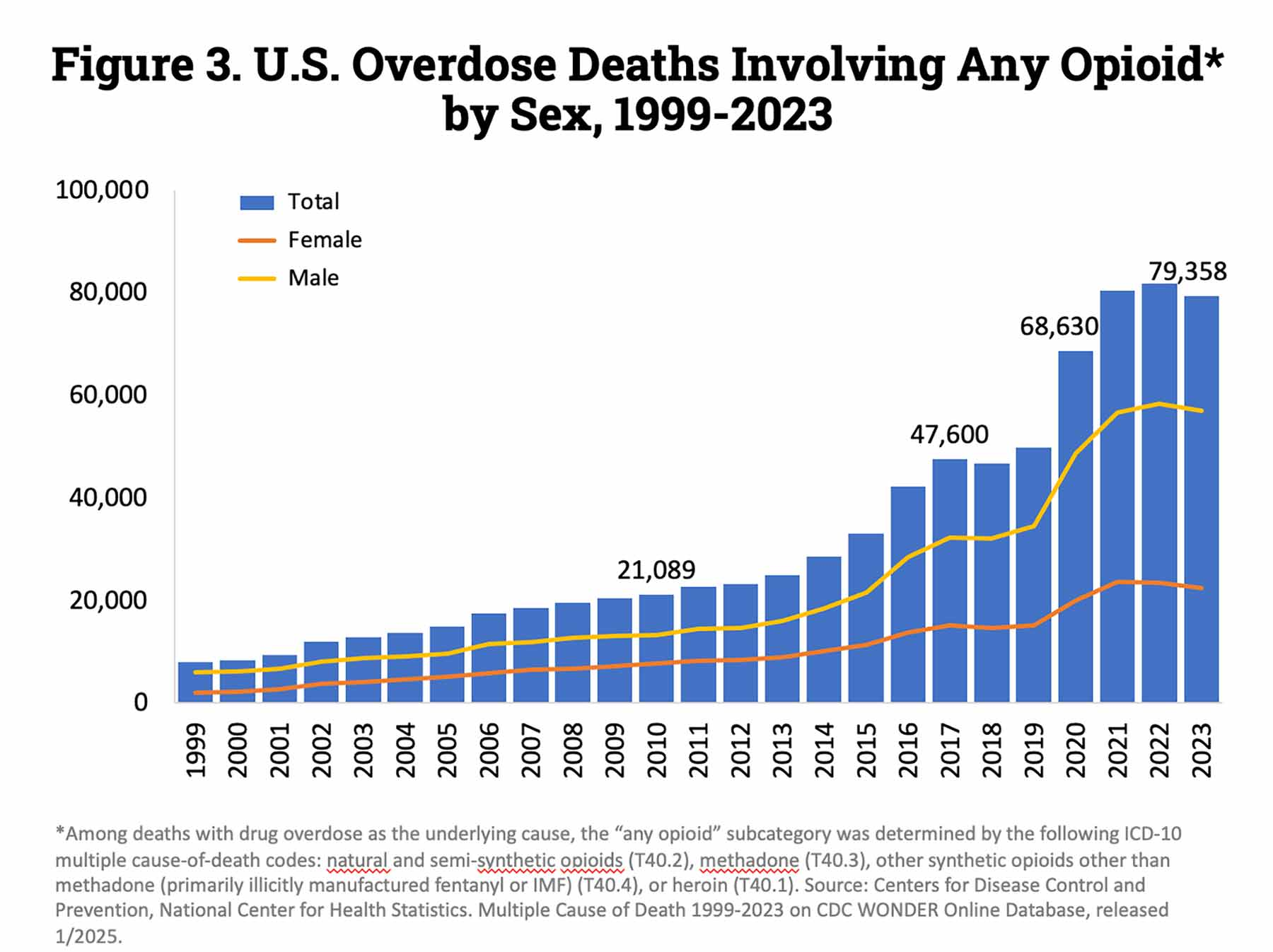
Opioids were involved in 81,806 overdose deaths in 2022, up from around 10,000 in 1999.

In 2018, Trump signed into law the First Step Act which, among other federal prison reforms, made the 2010 Fair Sentencing Act retroactive. A US Supreme Court decision in 2021 determined that retroactivity applied to cases where mandatory minimum penalties had been imposed.

In 2020, both the ACLU and The New York Times reported that Republicans and Democrats were in agreement that it was time to end the war on drugs. During his presidential campaign, President Joe Biden (2021–2025) stated that he would take the steps to alleviate the war on drugs and end the opioid epidemic.

On December 4, 2020, during the Trump administration, the House of Representatives passed the Marijuana Opportunity Reinvestment and Expungement Act (MORE Act), which would decriminalize cannabis at the federal level by removing it from the list of scheduled substances, expunge past convictions and arrests, and tax cannabis to "reinvest in communities targeted by the war on drugs". The MORE Act was received in the Senate in December 2020 where it remained. In April 2022, the act was again passed by the House, and awaits Senate action.

Where in the 1930s, the states led the federal government in prohibiting cannabis, as 2023, 38 states, four US territories, and the District of Columbia (DC) had legalized cannabis for medical use; for non-medical use, 24 of the states, three territories, and DC, had legalized it, and seven states decriminalized. Decriminalization in this context usually refers to first-time offenses and small quantities, such as, in the case of cannabis, under an ounce (28g). In November 2020, Oregon became the first state to decriminalize a number of drugs, including heroin, methamphetamine, PCP, LSD and oxycodone, shifting from a criminal approach to a public health approach; portions of that policy were reversed in April 2024.

In 2022, Biden signed into law the Medical Marijuana and Cannabidiol Research Expansion Act, easing restrictions on cannabis research for medical purposes. It was the first federal standalone cannabis reform bill. That October, Biden stated on social media, "We classify marijuana at the same level as heroin – and more serious than fentanyl. It makes no sense", and pledged to have the Attorney General review how cannabis is classified. On October 6, he pardoned all those with federal convictions for simple cannabis possession (to a degree symbolic, as none of those affected were imprisoned at the time), and urged the states, where the large majority of convictions rest, to do the same. His action affected 6,500 people convicted from 1992 to 2021, and thousands convicted in the District of Columbia.

==== Focus on fentanyl ====
In 2023, the US State Department announced plans to launch a "global coalition to address synthetic drug threats", with more than 80 countries expected to join. That April, Anne Milgram, head of the DEA since 2021, stated to Congress that two Mexican drug cartels posed "the greatest criminal threat the United States has ever faced." Supporting a DEA budget request of $3.7 billion for 2024, Milgram cited fentanyl in the "most devastating drug crisis in our nation's history."

In October 2023, OFAC sanctioned a China-based network of fentanyl manufacturers and distributors. The drug is usually manufactured in China, then shipped to Mexico, where it is processed and packaged, which is then smuggled into the US by Mexican drug cartels.

In January 2024, the DEA confirmed that it was reviewing the classification of cannabis as a Schedule I narcotic. Days later, documents were released from the Department of Health and Human Services stating that cannabis has "a currently accepted medical use" in the US and a "potential for abuse less than the drugs or other substances in Schedules I and II." On 30 April, indicating a DEA decision, the Justice Department announced the start of reclassification from Schedule I to Schedule III, drugs considered to have moderate to low potential for dependence, include ketamine, anabolic steroids, testosterone, and Tylenol with codeine.

In the DEA's "National Drug Threat Assessment 2024", director Milgram outlined the "most dangerous and deadly crisis", involving synthetic drugs including fentanyl and methamphetamine. She singled out the Sinaloa and Jalisco cartels in Mexico, and identified China as the source of precursor chemicals and machinery, and provider money laundering operations.

== Foreign involvement ==
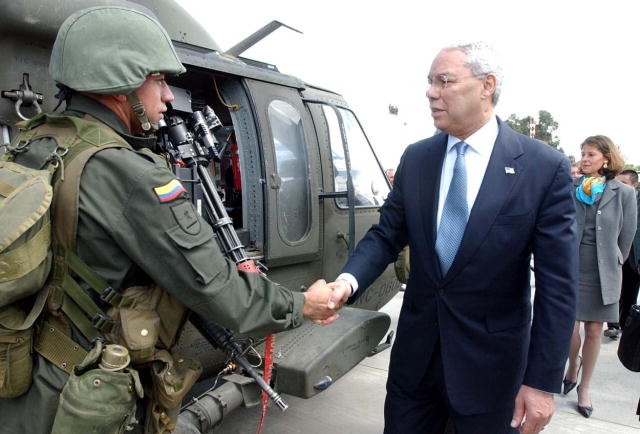
Colin Powell, as United States Secretary of State, visiting Colombia in the early 2000s as part of the United States' support of Plan Colombia.

US international involvement in drug control rests on the premise that assisting foreign governments in their anti-drug efforts reduces drug supply within the US.

Scholars have claimed that the war on drugs, a metaphorical war, is propaganda cloaking an extension of earlier military or paramilitary operations. Others have argued that large amounts of anti-drug foreign aid money, training, and equipment actually goes to fighting leftist insurgencies and is often provided to groups who themselves are involved in large-scale narco-trafficking, such as corrupt members of the Colombian military.

=== UN treaties and US influence ===
The three UN drug control conventions, adopted by over 180 countries, provide a legal framework for cooperation between countries. Each state is obligated to incorporate the treaty provisions in their domestic laws. While there is a degree of interpretative flexibility, "each of the treaties encourages – and often requires – that member countries put in place strong domestic penal provisions" to deal with illicit drugs; punitive policies have been the common approach. The US, emerging as the dominant power after WWII, exerted considerable influence over how the conventions were adopted by other nations, promoting a prohibitionist and criminalizing view. Historically, the US has been "the key player in most multilateral negotiations" and the prohibitionist approach "derives largely from U.S. policy – the various forms, past and present, of the U.S. 'war on drugs'".

US economic power is focused on the war on drugs through the Foreign Assistance Act (FAA). Enacted in 1961, the FAA integrated various federal foreign aid initiatives under the new US Agency for International Development (USAID), and has remained the core legislation governing foreign financial assistance. In 1972, reacting to concerns over illicit drugs from foreign sources, Congress added an "International Narcotics Control" chapter to the FAA, which allowed the president to enter into agreements and provide assistance for counternarcotic activities in foreign countries. It also made US economic and military aid, including arms sales, dependent on countries aligning with US anti-drug policies. Later, the terms "major illicit drug-producing country" and "major drug-transit country" were defined in the act; as of 1986, the president has been required to annually determine which countries fit those definitions. Those not adequately cooperating with counter-drug efforts would not be eligible to receive US financial aid, although the president could and has provided waivers to individual countries. The so-called "majors list" has influenced how US assistance money is used internationally in the war on drugs, although in recent years, it has remained relatively static and lost a degree of relevancy. In September 2023, President Biden added China to the majors list, citing its production of precursor chemicals.

Foreign anti-drug initiatives initially focused on Latin America, and expanded globally over time. Since the 1970s, billions of US aid dollars have been directed to anti-drug activity in Latin America. The US initially treated drug control as a law enforcement issue in foreign countries, providing assistance to police forces. In the 1980s, the US increasingly involved the military and private security firms, to provide training and support to armed forces in drug-producing and transit countries. As of 2024, the DEA has, in addition to 241 domestic offices, 93 foreign offices in 69 countries. In addition to numerous cooperative law enforcement actions worldwide against drug trafficking and money laundering, the DEA and other agencies, and the US military, have been involved in multi-year foreign drug campaigns, including in Colombia, Mexico and Afghanistan.

On January 3, 2026, the United States launched a large-scale military operation, including airstrikes across northern Venezuela, and captured Venezuelan President Nicolas Maduro and his wife, Cilia Flores, during a raid in Caracas. U.S. forces flew them to New York, where they are to face federal charges including narco-terrorism and cocaine trafficking related to a long-standing indictment.

=== "War on cartels" (2025–present) ===
The "war on cartels" is a hybridization of the war on terror and the war on drugs. The strategy represents an operational and legal paradigm shift from civilian law enforcement toward military counterinsurgency. This legitimizes the use of drone strikes, offensive cyber warfare, and extraterritorial special operations, manifest in Operation Southern Spear, under the premise that cartels are paramilitary structures. The legal basis for this strategy is contentious within the US government, centered around the absence of Congressional approval.

On January 20, 2025, President Trump signed an executive order adding a number of drug cartels and criminal organizations, including the major Mexican cartels, to the list of Foreign Terrorist Organizations and Specially Designated Global Terrorists. On January 28, the US Navy announced Operation Southern Spear as a program to develop its Hybrid Fleet capabilities by using robotic and autonomous boats and aircraft to detect and monitor illicit trafficking.

On September 2, 2025, Trump announced that the US had struck a boat carrying unspecified illegal drugs and killed 11 "narco-terrorists", alleging it was operated by the Tren de Aragua. By June 2026, an estimated 210 people had been killed in over 60 US military boat strikes. US congressional lawmakers, experts in conflict law, and the UN have questioned the legality of the strikes, and variously suggested that they are extrajudicial killings and crimes against humanity. On October 1, 2025, in the context of the US naval deployment in the Caribbean, Trump formally declared that the US is engaged in a "non-international armed conflict" with "unlawful combatants" associated with drug cartels operating in the Caribbean.

On November 13, 2025, Defense Secretary Pete Hegseth announced Operation Southern Spear as a campaign to "disrupt the flow of narcotics in the Western Hemisphere from drug cartels that the President has named as designated terrorist organizations." The relationship to the existing Navy operation of the same name was not made clear.

=== Latin America ===
In 2021, Gustavo Gorriti, journalist and founder of corruption-focused IDL-Reporteros news media, wrote a sharply critical editorial in the Washington Post on the impact of 50 years of the war on drugs on Latin America. He described the flow of drugs to the US as an "unstoppable industry" that triggered an economic revolution throughout the region, where the illegal drug trade with its high profit margins far exceeded the potential of legitimate businesses. Corruption among politicians and anti-drug forces soared, even as those in charge were "cultivating close relationships with U.S. enforcement and intelligence agencies." An underclass of poor farmers became economic hostages, depending on drug crops for their survival. The big winners were "the systems built to wage a fight that they soon realized would have no end. ... [The war on drugs] became a source for endless resources, inflated budgets, contracts, purchase orders, power, influence – new economies battling drug trafficking but also dependent on it."

At a meeting in Guatemala in 2012, three former presidents from Guatemala, Mexico and Colombia said that the war on drugs had failed and that they would propose a discussion on alternatives, including decriminalization, at the Summit of the Americas in April of that year. Guatemalan President Otto Pérez Molina said that the war on drugs was exacting too high a price on the lives of Central Americans and that it was time to "end the taboo on discussing decriminalization". At the summit, the government of Colombia pushed for far-reaching changes to drugs policy, citing the catastrophic effects of the war on drugs in Colombia.

==== Colombia ====
Historically, the illicit drug trade in Colombia had strong connections to right-wing paramilitaries like the United Self-Defenders of Colombia (AUC) and leftist guerilla groups like the Revolutionary Armed Forces of Colombia (FARC), thus US anti-drug efforts in the country overlapped with support for counterinsurgency efforts. In the late 1960s, when drug smuggling to the US from Mexico rose to a major scale, the two governments cooperated in the launch of the Mexican drug war; the market disruption gave Colombian traffickers an opportunity to fill US demand for cannabis.

Until the 1970s, Colombia "had played no major role in the production and circulation of illegal drugs in the hemisphere". After a military coup in Chile in 1973 and the spread of political repression through the Southern Cone countries disrupted cocaine smuggling from Peru and Bolivia, Colombia stepped in to fill the demand for cocaine. Pressed by the US, the Colombian government, under president Misael Pastrana (1970–1974), worked with the newly formed DEA to establish the future path for the country's war on drugs.

During the 1970s, the "marijuana boom" dominated Colombia's drug trade, peaking mid-decade. That soon gave way to cocaine and the rise of the infamous Medellin and Cali Cartels that grew through the 1980s and early 1990s to dominate the global cocaine market. By the end of the century, the brutal anti-drug war left the security situation in Colombia in critical condition. Through the Plan Colombia program, between 2000 and 2015, the US provided Colombia with $10 billion in funding, primarily for military aid, training, and equipment, to fight both drugs and left-wing guerrillas such as FARC (which had been accused of participation in drug trafficking).

The Clinton administration initially waived all but one of the human rights conditions attached to Plan Colombia, considering such aid as crucial to national security at the time. Private US military contractors, including the former DynCorp, were contracted by the State and Defense Departments, to carry out anti-drug initiatives as part of Plan Colombia. Colombian military personnel received extensive counterinsurgency training from US military and law enforcement agencies, including the School of Americas (SOA).

The efforts of the US and Colombian governments have been criticized for focusing on fighting leftist guerrillas in southern regions without applying enough pressure on right-wing paramilitaries and continuing drug smuggling operations in the north of the country. Human Rights Watch, congressional committees and other entities have documented connections between members of the Colombian military and the AUC, which the US government has listed as a terrorist group, and that Colombian military personnel have committed human rights abuses which would make them ineligible for US aid under current laws.

Coca eradication by aerial spraying of herbicides such as glyphosate was a controversial element of Plan Colombia. Environmental consequences resulting from spraying have been criticized as detrimental to some of the world's most fragile ecosystems; the same spraying practices are further credited with causing health problems in local populations.

A report by the RAND Corporation, examining the Colombian experience for insights applicable to the Mexican drug war, noted that "Plan Colombia has been widely hailed as a success, and some analysts believe that, by 2010, Colombian security forces had finally gained the upper hand once and for all." The report cited dramatic reductions in kidnappings and terrorist acts, and the recapture of territory, attributed to "a reinforced military and reinvigorated police force." It also found that, as of 2010, "Colombia is still a major source country for illicit narcotics. Moreover, the state continues to share sovereignty with a range of violent nonstate actors, including rebel groups and rightwing paramilitaries allied with drug traffickers and wealthy landowners." The Washington Office on Latin America concluded in 2010 that both Plan Colombia and the Colombian government's security strategy "came at a high cost in lives and resources, only did part of the job, are yielding diminishing returns and have left important institutions weaker."

==== Mexico ====
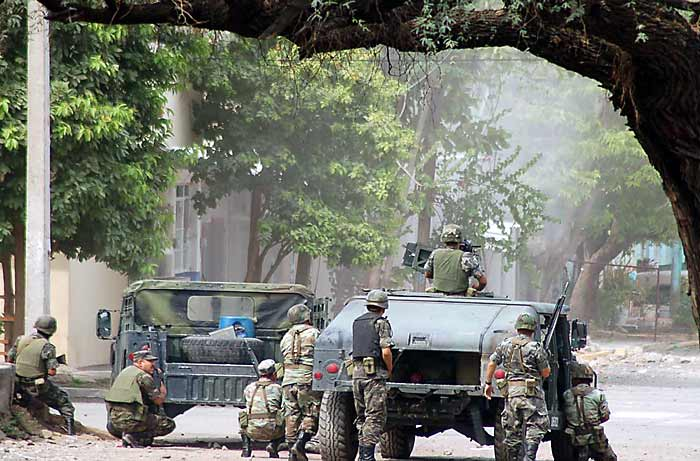
Mexican troops during a gun battle in Michoacán, 2007. Mexico's drug war claims nearly 50,000 lives each year.

One of the first anti-drug efforts in the realm of foreign policy was Nixon's Operation Intercept, announced in September 1969, aiming to severely reduce the amount of cannabis entering the US from Mexico, by government estimates the source of 80% of the US supply. The effort began with an intense inspection crackdown that resulted in a near shutdown of cross-border traffic. The US Air Force and Navy were also on alert to pursue traffickers in the air and at sea. The burden on border crossings was controversial in border states; the effort lasted only 20 days.

In the 1970s, presidents Gerald Ford and Jimmy Carter backed aerial campaigns to destroy marijuana field in Mexico. In 1977, 9,500 acres of marijuana plants were destroyed used by spraying herbicide and shooting peasants who resisted. The spraying threatened the health of up to 13 million marijuana user in the U.S. at the time. The practice was banned by the Percy Amendment in 1978 and subsequently brought back and used domestically by Ronald Reagan.

The pursuit of Joaquín "El Chapo" Guzmán from 2001 to 2014 illustrates the challenges of combating sophisticated transnational criminal organizations. Guzmán was the leader of the Sinaloa Cartel, which generated billions in illicit revenue from the US and Europe. His 2001 escape from a high-security Mexican prison and subsequent evasion until his 2014 capture highlighted the systemic corruption, institutional weaknesses, and cross-border complexities. While on the run, Guzmán reportedly travelled with an entourage of armed bodyguards equivalent to those of a head of state, using a vast surveillance network and bullet-proof cars, aircraft, and all-terrain vehicles. The operation to apprehend him, involving Mexican authorities, and the DEA and other US agencies, underscored the necessity of international cooperation, intelligence-sharing, and advanced surveillance technologies. Throughout, the cartel's operations continued unabated.

The Mérida Initiative, launched in 2008, was a security cooperation program between the US and Mexico, aimed at combating drug trafficking and transnational crime. From 2008 to 2021, the US provided $3.5 billion in funding. The initial focus was anti-drug and rule-of-law measures, later broadened to include US-Mexico border activities. Components included military and law enforcement training and equipment, and technical advice and training to strengthen the national justice systems. In 2021, it was replaced by the Bicentennial Framework for Security, Public Health, and Safe Communities.

In 2013, a Pew Research Center poll found that 85% of Mexican citizens supported using the Mexican army against drug cartels, 74% supported US training assistance for their police and military, 55% supported the US supplying of weapons and financial aid, and 59% were against deploying US troops on Mexican soil. Anti-drug efforts were seen as making progress by 37%, losing ground by 29%, and staying the same by 30%; 56% believed that the US and Mexico are both to blame for drug violence in Mexico.

As of 2024, the DEA considers the Sinaloa and Jalisco cartels, tied to materials and services from China, as the major source of synthetic drugs like fentanyl and methamphetamine, posing the biggest threat to the US.

According to federal court documents in Manhattan, Gerardo Merida Sanchez—a former public security official in the Mexican state of Sinaloa—is accused of teaming up with leaders of the Sinaloa cartel to sneak large amounts of drugs into the United States. The indictment says he took more than $100,000 a month in bribes from Los Chapitos to protect the cartel's smuggling routes into the U.S. He was arrested in Arizona on May 11 and then transferred to New York. This case shows how drug production and trafficking networks in Mexico play a role in supplying a large share of the illegal drugs that end up being used in the United States.

==== Venezuela ====
Since Hugo Chávez came to power in 1999, Venezuela has played a pivotal role in the landscape of the war on drugs, establishing itself as a strategic hub for the transit of narcotics, particularly cocaine, due to its geographic position between Colombia, the world's leading cocaine producer, and routes to the US and Europe. Chávez's decision in 2005 to sever ties with the DEA, accusing its representatives of espionage, marked a turning point that weakened international interdiction efforts in the country. This rupture not only curtailed intelligence sharing and bilateral cooperation but also allowed Venezuela to become a more permeable corridor for drug trafficking, with a significant increase in the volume of drugs transiting through its territory. The involvement of the Venezuelan government in drug trafficking activities has been extensively documented, with allegations pointing to high-ranking officials and military personnel as key actors in what is known as the Cartel of the Suns. Nicolás Maduro assumed the presidency after Chávez's death in 2013—on January 3, 2026, in Operation Absolute Resolve, he and his wife were seized in a US special forces raid at his residence and transported to the US to face drug trafficking charges.

==== Ecuador ====
Ecuador, located between the world's two largest cocaine-producing countries, Colombia and Peru, has long been a major drug transit point. From 1999, the Manta air base was the US military's most prominent South American presence, originating some 100 drug surveillance flights monthly. In 2009, citing unwanted internal influence by the CIA, Ecuador declined to renew the base's lease, ending official US military presence. Since 2018, drug activity and anti-drug efforts in Ecuador have dramatically intensified. In 2023, the US-Ecuador Defense Bilateral Working Group was formed to address the Ecuadorian situation, and a memorandum of agreement to help strengthen the Ecuadorian military was signed. A drug-related wider conflict broke out in 2024. On March 6, 2026 the US participated in the Ecuadorian conflict against drug traffickers as part of a joint Ecuadorian Operation on the border of Colombia, marking the first instance of direct military participation by the US in the Ecuadorian conflict.

==== Central America ====
The countries of Central America – Belize, Costa Rica, El Salvador, Guatemala, Honduras, Nicaragua, and Panama – are major transit and storage points for drugs headed to Mexico and the US that annually appear on the American "majors list". The US has had varying levels of direct anti-drug involvement in each of these countries, particularly since the late 2000s when concern over trafficking activity increased. Beginning in 2008, the Central America Regional Security Initiative (CARSI) has provided the seven countries with equipment, training, and technical support for law enforcement efforts, and the US has advised taking an intelligence-based approach.

During the 1980s civil war in Nicaragua, the US-backed anti-leftist rebel force known as the Contras were linked to cocaine trafficking as a means of funding, which led to charges of US involvement in the Contras drug trade. In 1986, a $24 million civil suit related to the La Penca bombing, on behalf of journalists Tony Avirgan and Martha Honey, claimed the defendants, including Iran-Contra figures and two CIA officials, illegally participating in assassinations, and arms and drug trafficking. A staff report for Senator John Kerry's 1988 Senate Committee on Foreign Relations investigating narcotics, terrorism and international operations in Latin and Central America and the Caribbean found that the Contras were involved in drug trafficking and that the US was aware of it; no evidence was found to directly implicate Contra leadership. The charges of CIA involvement were revived in 1996, when a newspaper series, "Dark Alliance", by reporter Gary Webb in the San Jose Mercury News claimed that the trafficking had played an important role in the creation of the crack cocaine drug problem in the US. Webb's series led to three federal investigations, all of which concluded there was no evidence of a conspiracy by CIA officials or its employees to bring drugs into the United States. The Los Angeles Times, The New York Times, and The Washington Post launched their own investigations and rejected Webb's allegations. An internal report issued in 1998 by the CIA in response to the Webb allegations admitted that the agency was aware of Contra involvement in drug trafficking, and in some cases dissuaded the DEA and other agencies from investigating the Contra supply networks involved.

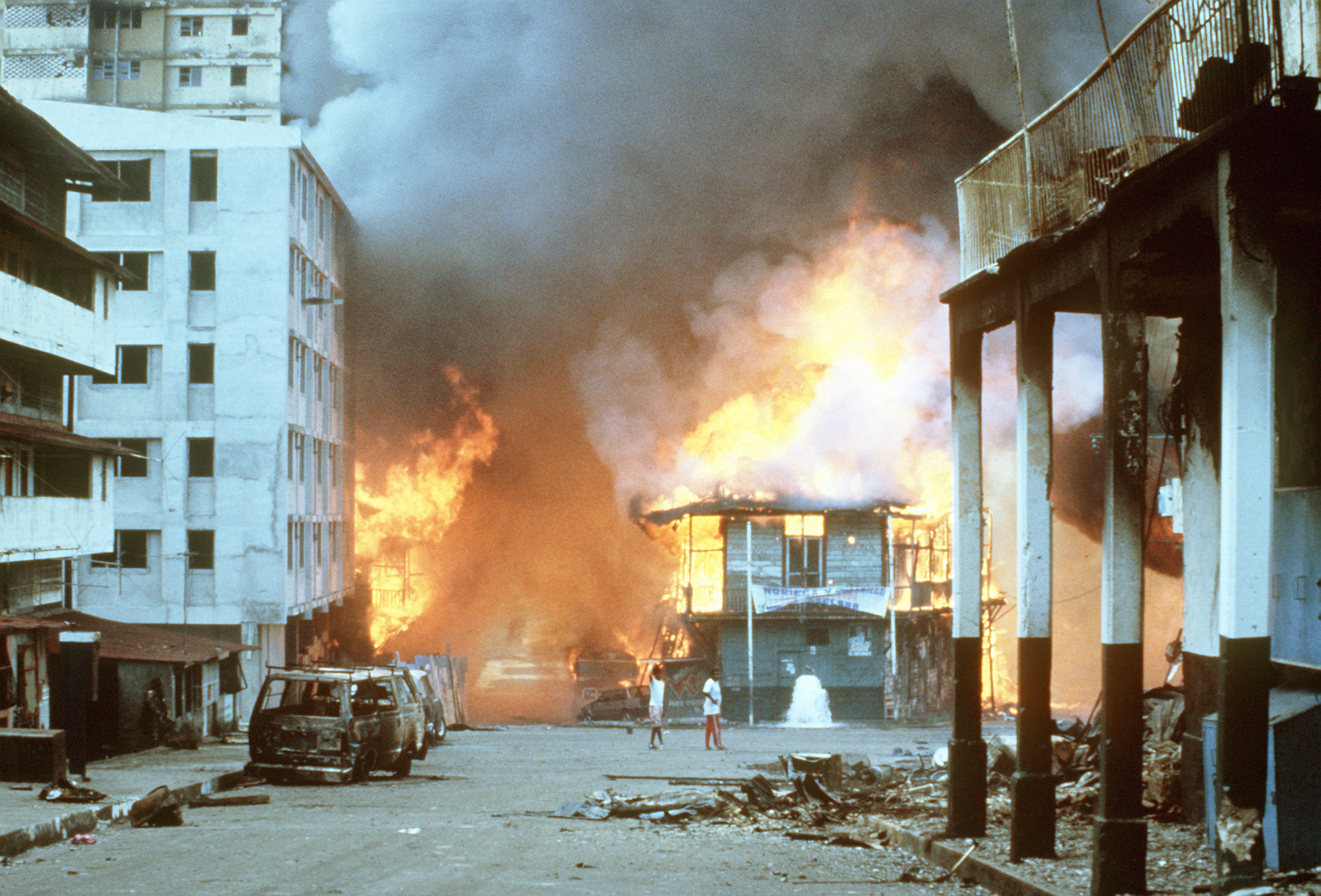
The U.S. Military invasion of Panama in 1989

On December 20, 1989, the US invaded Panama with 25,000 American troops in Operation Just Cause, to depose and arrest the Panamanian head of government, Manuel Noriega. Noriega had been providing military assistance to Contra groups in Nicaragua at the request of the US, which in turn paid him and tolerated his drug trafficking activities, known since the 1960s. Relations with the US deteriorated in the mid-1980s, and his dealings with the US government were exposed in the US news media. The killing of a US soldier in Panama was the final act leading to the invasion. Noriega surrendered to US soldiers on January 3, 1990. He was indicted by the DEA and sentenced by a US court to 45 years in prison for racketeering, drug smuggling, and money laundering. The UN General Assembly resolved that the invasion was a "flagrant violation of international law."

In 2012, the US sent DEA agents to Honduras to assist security forces in counter-narcotic operations. Honduras has been a major stop for drug traffickers, who use small planes and landing strips hidden throughout the country to transport drugs. The DEA, working with other US agencies such as the State Department, the CBP, and Joint Task Force-Bravo, assisted Honduran troops in conducting raids on traffickers' sites of operation.

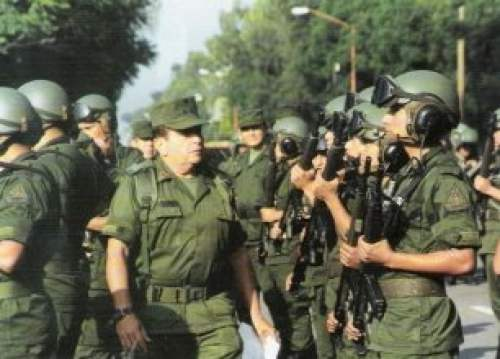
Mexico is scheduled to receive US$1.6 billion in equipment and strategic support from the United States through the Mérida Initiative.

==== Impact on growers ====
The US-supported coca eradication policy has been criticized for its negative impact on the livelihood of South American coca growers, in a region where the coca leaf has traditionally been chewed and used in tea and for religious, medicinal and nutritional purposes by locals Making traditional coca cultivation illegal is viewed as unjust. In areas where forced eradication also destroyed other food or market crops, without providing an alternative, farmers were left starving and destitute.

=== Afghanistan ===
In 2001, a US-led military coalition invaded Afghanistan and toppled the ruling Taliban as part of the war on terror response to 9/11. For generations, Afghanistan had been producing opium; the Taliban, in power since 1996, banned opium in 2000, reducing domestic production by 90% within a year, cutting the world opium supply by an estimated 65%. With the invasion, poppy cultivation and opium manufacture resumed, and the war on drugs became an element of the US presence.

Initially, "everyone did their own thing, not thinking how it fit in with the larger effort. State was trying to eradicate, USAID was marginally trying to do livelihoods, and DEA was going after bad guys", a senior Department of Defense official stated in a later report. In 2004, opium production dramatically increased and eradication became the focus. The DEA operating budget in Afghanistan grew from $3.7 million in 2004 to $40.6 million in 2008. In 2009, eradication was halted – a senior US official called it "the least effective program ever" – in favor of an "alternative livelihoods" approach that encouraged farmers to grow other crops. In 2017, eradication once again became the main initiative; the US military launched an aerial campaign involving B-52 bombers and F-22 fighters striking a network of drug labs that turned out to be mostly empty compounds, though there were significant civilian casualties.

Undermining US efforts, the prohibitionist policies encouraged a flourishing opium black market, which in turn incentivized widespread, systemic corruption in the Afghan government. In 2018, the US Special Inspector General for Afghanistan Reconstruction called the counternarcotics operation to date "a total failure". As the US military presence neared an end in 2020, Afghanistan was producing an estimated 85% of the world's opium. Having spent some $9 billion in the 20-year anti-drug component of the war, US forces left Afghanistan in 2021, and the Taliban returned to power.

==== NATO involvement ====
The North Atlantic Treaty Organization (NATO) has played a role in addressing the issue of drug trafficking, particularly in Afghanistan, as part of its broader security and stabilization efforts. NATO has supported counter-narcotics initiatives by assisting the Afghan government in building its capacity to combat the illegal drug trade, which is seen as a major source of funding for insurgent groups. NATO's efforts include training and equipping Afghan security forces to enhance their ability to disrupt drug trafficking networks, as well as supporting intelligence-sharing and coordination with international partners. These activities are framed within NATO's mission to promote stability and security, recognizing the link between the drug trade and threats to regional and global security.

However, perspectives on NATO's involvement in counter-narcotics operations have varied, with some reports highlighting tensions with other international actors, such as the United Nations. While NATO emphasizes its contributions to reducing the drug trade through capacity-building and support for Afghan-led initiatives, other sources have noted discrepancies in reported outcomes, suggesting that the drug trade in Afghanistan remained robust despite these efforts. For instance, data from 2012 indicates that opium production continued to thrive, raising questions about the effectiveness of NATO's strategies in this domain. Nonetheless, NATO's engagement reflects a commitment to addressing the complex interplay between security, governance, and the illicit drug economy, even as challenges persist in achieving measurable reductions in trafficking activities.

=== China ===
In the mid-2010s, the US identified China as a primary source of illicit fentanyl and other synthetic opioids. American anti-drug intervention regarding China is influenced and constrained by the geopolitical sensitivities of US-China relations. The US employs several approaches: exerting diplomatic pressure on China to impose internal controls on illicit drugs; seeking cooperation in US and international law enforcement efforts; unilaterally imposing targeted sanctions; and bringing criminal indictments against Chinese companies and individuals. The effectiveness of these approaches depends significantly on China's level of implementation and enforcement, which is directly related to the fluctuating state of overall US-China relations.

Following China's scheduling of fentanyl-class substances in 2019, the flow of synthetic opioids from China to the US appeared to subside; trafficking from China shifted to precursor chemicals and related equipment, and Mexico's drug cartels emerged as major clients.

In November 2023, President Biden announced an agreement with General Secretary Xi Jinping for China to crack down on the export of precursor chemicals and pill presses to the Western Hemisphere. A US House committee report released in April 2024 found companies making fentanyl precursors in China can still apply for Chinese state tax rebates and other financial benefits after exporting the product. According to the US, in 2024, China continues to be the primary supplier of chemical precursors to Mexican drug cartels, and Chinese money launderers have become central to the global drug trade.

In December 2024, a Chinese national in Chicago was sentenced to 10 years in prison laundering $62 million in drug money for Mexican traffickers involving currency swaps between United States and China, and China and Mexico. In January 2025, two former executives of a Chinese chemical company were convicted of a scheme to import fentanyl precursor chemicals into the United States. One was sentenced to 25 years in prison and the other to 15 years.

== Domestic impact ==
Psychiatrist Thomas Szasz wrote in 1997, "Over the past thirty years, we have replaced the medical-political persecution of illegal sex users ('perverts' and 'psychopaths') with the even more ferocious medical-political persecution of illegal drug users." Assessing from a health perspective, a study in the Annals of Medicine noted: "The U.S. war on drugs has subjected millions to criminalization, incarceration, and lifelong criminal records, disrupting or altogether eliminating their access to adequate resources and supports to live healthy lives."

=== Arrest and incarceration ===
The war on drugs caused soaring arrest rates in the US that disproportionately targeted African Americans due to various factors. Anti-drug and tough-on-crime policies from the 1970s through the 1990s created a situation where the US, with less than 5% of the world population, houses nearly 25% of the world's prisoners. Increased demand lead to the development of privatization and the for-profit prison industry. As of 2015, the US prison population rate was 716 per 100,000 people, the highest in the world, six times higher than Canada and six to nine times higher than Western European countries.

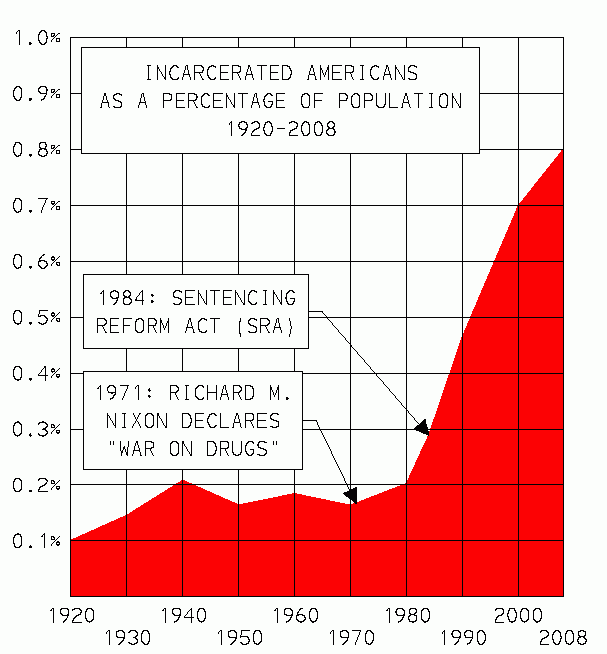
Graph demonstrating increases in United States incarceration rate

In the 1980s, while the number of arrests for all crimes had risen by 28%, the number of arrests for drug offenses rose 126%. In 1994, the New England Journal of Medicine reported that the war on drugs resulted in the incarceration of one million Americans each year. In 2008, The Washington Post reported that of 1.5 million Americans arrested each year for drug offenses, half a million would be incarcerated, and one in five black Americans would spend time behind bars due to drug laws. In 2019, the FBI estimated about 1.5 million drug arrests nationally, 32.1% for cannabis and 31% for "other dangerous nonnarcotic drugs".

Federal and state policies also impose collateral consequences on those convicted of drug offenses, separate from fines and prison time, that are not applicable to other types of crime. To comply with a federal law known as the Solomon–Lautenberg amendment, a number of states require a six-months driver's license suspension for anyone convicted of a drug offense. Other examples of collateral consequences for drug offenses, or for felony offenses in general, include loss of professional license, loss of ability to legally purchase a firearm under Federal law, loss of eligibility for food stamps, loss of eligibility for Federal Student Aid, loss of eligibility to live in public housing, loss of ability to vote, and deportation, a total of over 460 benefits at risk at the federal level alone. The US provides for the deportation of non-citizens convicted of drug offenses.

==== Prison overcrowding ====
One consequence of the war on drugs policy has been the overcrowding of American prisons. The policy's approach to prosecuting drug-related crimes led to a surge in incarcerated individuals for nonviolent drug offenses. As a result, many prisons have become overburdened, often operating at capacities far beyond their intended limits. Overcrowding strains the prison system and raises questions about the effectiveness of incarceration as a solution to drug-related issues. Resources that could be allocated to address the root causes of drug abuse, provide rehabilitation and treatment programs, or support communities affected by drug-related issues, are instead used to manage the considerable prison population. Critics argue that focusing solely on incarceration fails to address the underlying social factors contributing to drug abuse and perpetuates a cycle of criminality without offering pathways to recovery and reintegration into society.

==== Racial disparities in sentencing ====
Racial disparities have been a prominent and contentious aspect of the war on drugs in the US. In 1957, a belief at the time about drug use was summarized by journalist Max Lerner in his work, America as a Civilization: "As a case in point we may take the known fact of the prevalence of reefer and dope addiction in Negro areas. This is essentially explained in terms of poverty, slum living, and broken families, yet it would be easy to show the lack of drug addiction among other ethnic groups where the same conditions apply."

The Anti-Drug Abuse Act of 1986 created a 100:1 sentencing disparity in the US for the trafficking or possession of crack when compared to penalties for trafficking of powder cocaine. The bill had been widely criticized as discriminatory against minorities, mostly Black Americans, who were more likely to use crack than powder cocaine. In 1994, studying the effects of the 100:1 sentencing ratio, the United States Sentencing Commission (USSC) found that nearly two-thirds of crack users were white or Hispanic, while nearly 85% of those convicted for possession were black, with similar numbers for trafficking. Powder cocaine offenders were more equally divided across race. The USSC noted that these disparities resulted in African Americans serving longer prison sentences than other ethnicities. In a 1995 report to Congress, the USSC recommended against the 100:1 sentencing ratio. In 2010, the 100:1 sentencing ratio was reduced to 18:1.

Other studies indicated similarly dramatic racial differences in enforcement and sentencing. Statistics from 1998 show that there were wide racial disparities in arrests, prosecutions, sentencing and deaths. African-American drug users made up for 35% of drug arrests, 55% of convictions, and 74% of people sent to prison for drug possession crimes. Nationwide African-Americans were sent to state prisons for drug offenses 13 times more often than other races, even though they supposedly constituted only 13% of regular drug users. Human Rights Watch's report, "Race and the Drug War" (2000), provided extensive documentation of racial disparities, citing statistics and case studies highlighting the unequal treatment of racial and ethnic groups by law enforcement agencies, particularly in drug arrests. According to the report, in the US in 1999, compared to non-minorities, African Americans were far more likely to be arrested for drug crimes, and received much stiffer penalties and sentences.

Reporting on the effects of state initiatives, the Department of Justice found that, from 1990 through 2000, "the increasing number of drug offenses accounted for 27% of the total growth among black inmates, 7% of the total growth among Hispanic inmates, and 15% of the growth among white inmates."

In Malign Neglect – Race Crime and Punishment in America (1995), criminologist Michael Tonry wrote, "The War on Drugs foreseeably and unnecessarily blighted the lives of hundreds and thousands of young disadvantaged black Americans and undermined decades of effort to improve the life chances of members of the urban black underclass."

==== Permanent underclass creation ====
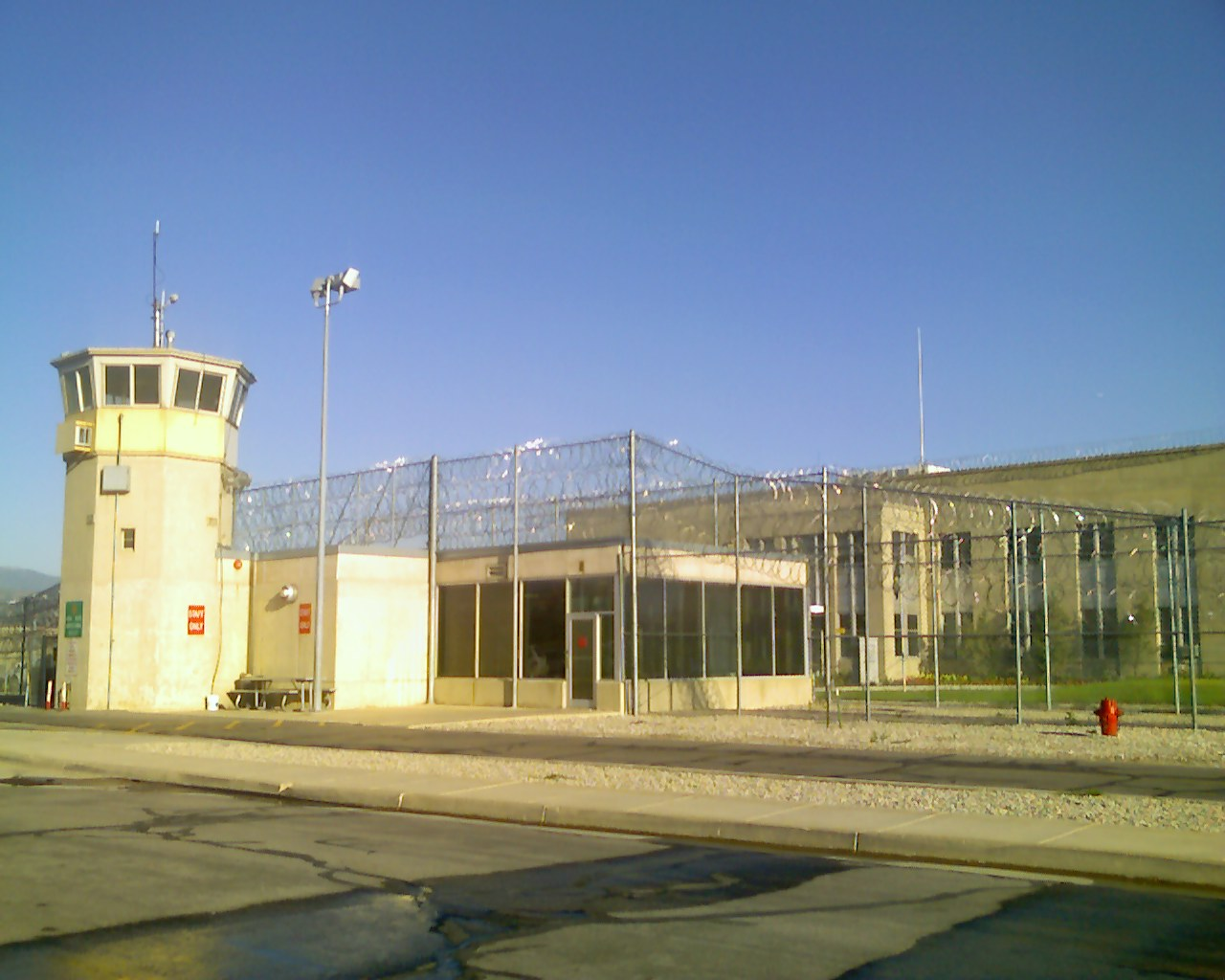
Approximately 1 million people are incarcerated every year in the United States for drug law violations.

Penalties for drug crimes among American youth almost always involve permanent or semi-permanent removal from opportunities for education, strip them of voting rights, and later involve creation of criminal records which make employment more difficult. One-fifth of the US prison population are incarcerated for a drug offense. Thus, some authors maintain that the war on drugs has resulted in the creation of a permanent underclass of people who have few educational or job opportunities, often as a result of being punished for drug offenses which in turn have resulted from attempts to earn a living in spite of having no education or job opportunities.

In her 2010 book, The New Jim Crow: Mass Incarceration in the Age of Colorblindness, Michelle Alexander argues that the war on drugs has effectively perpetuated a racial caste system, with African American and Hispanic individuals experiencing disproportionately high rates of arrest, conviction, and incarceration for drug-related offenses. This system functions as a modern form of racial control, stripping individuals of their rights and opportunities, and reinforcing societal inequalities. According to Alexander, the consequences extend beyond criminal justice, affecting economic opportunities, access to education, and overall social mobility for affected individuals and communities.

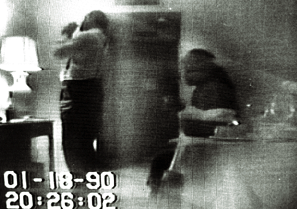
D.C. Mayor Marion Barry captured on a surveillance camera smoking crack cocaine during a sting operation by the FBI and D.C. Police

=== Drug testing in the workplace ===
Workplace drug testing has been widespread and controversial in the US since the late 1980s: there is no clear measure of its effectiveness in improving safety and productivity, and testing affects significantly more non-whites than whites. Testing is more prevalent in the US than elsewhere in the world. Most common is urine analysis for amphetamines, cocaine, marijuana, opioids and PCP; usually with no practical discrimination between the effects of the different drugs. Workplace testing rapidly gained popularity after the Reagan administration made it mandatory for federal workers, peaking in 1996, with 81% of companies reporting drug screening, up from 21% in 1987.

In the 1980s, testing had been promoted to business as a way to reclaim what were said to be huge losses in productivity caused by drug use. Studies released in the 1990s refuted these claims; a 1994 report from the National Academy of Sciences, "Under the Influence? Drugs and the American Work Force", concluded that "the data... do not provide clear evidence of the deleterious effects of drugs other than alcohol on safety and other job performance indicators." By 2004, workplace testing was down to 62% of companies, in 2015, it was reported as below 50%. Drug use continues to be blamed for productivity losses, and testing remains common.

In 2021, some companies began to reduce drug testing to improve hiring prospects in a tight labor market. Amazon, America's second largest employer, eliminated cannabis testing in job pre-screening, where not required by government regulations, stating, "Pre-employment marijuana testing has disproportionately affected communities of color by stalling job placement." In a survey of 45,000 companies worldwide, 9% reported the elimination of testing to improve hiring. In 2022, thousands of US truck drivers were taken off the road after testing positive for cannabis, contributing to a severe driver shortage; a conflict between the majority of states with some form of cannabis legalization, and the federal Department of Transportation's zero-tolerance cannabis policy, even for medical use, is cited as a problem.

=== Public opinion ===
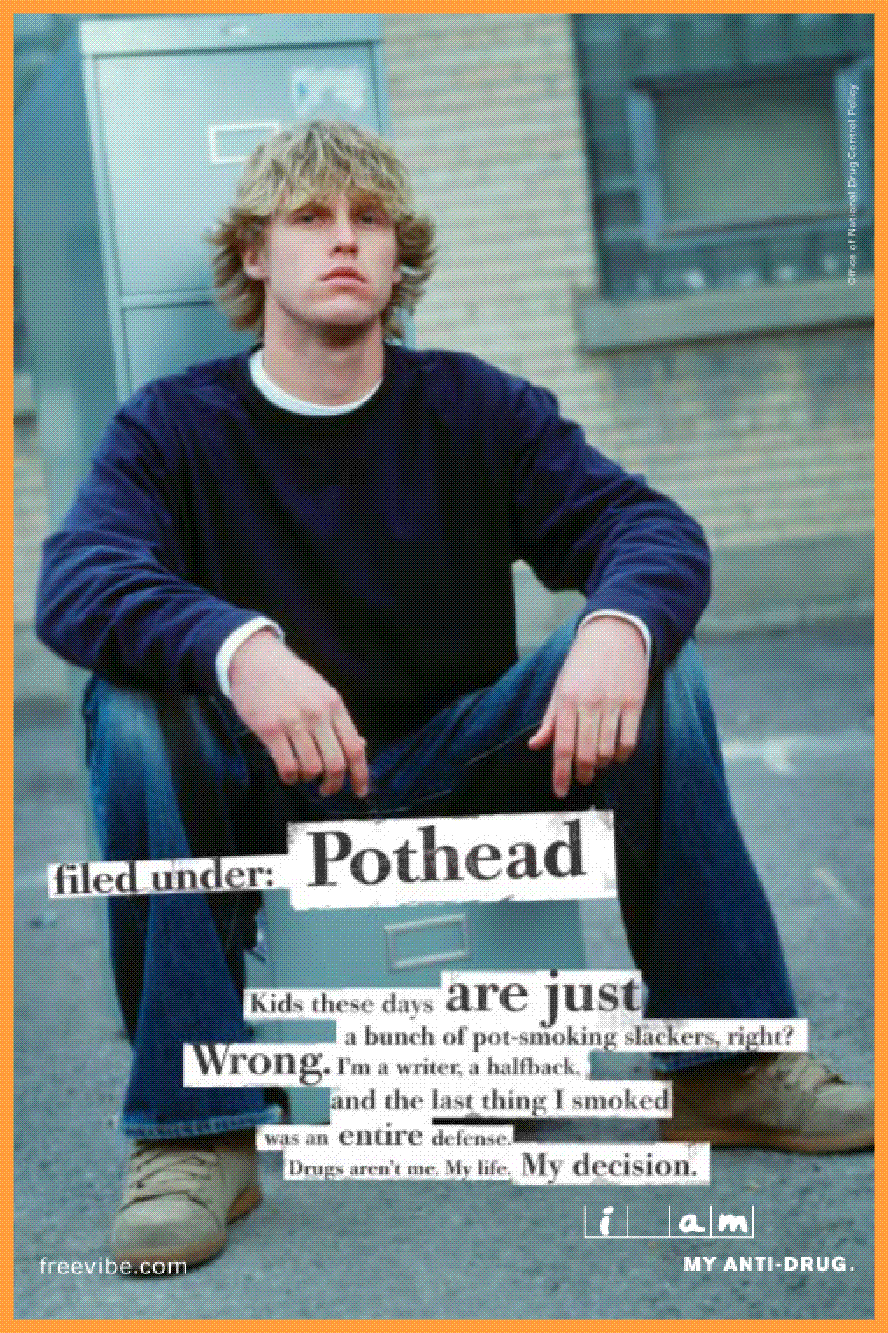
A US government domestic public interest poster c. 2000 concerning cannabis in the United States

In the 21st century, according to polling, a majority of Americans have been skeptical about the methods and effectiveness of the war on drugs. In 2014, a Pew Research Center poll found that 67% of Americans feel that a movement towards treatment for drugs like cocaine and heroin is better versus 26% who feel that prosecution is the better route. Moving away from mandatory prison terms for drug crimes was favored by two-thirds of the population, a substantial shift from a fifty-fifty split in 2001. A large majority saw alcohol as a greater danger to health (69%) and society (63%) than cannabis. In Gallup polls on whether cannabis should be legal, 15% of Americans agreed in March 1972, rising to 28% in April 1977, where it roughly stayed until 2000, when it began rising again, to 68% in October 2021. In May 2021, a Bully Pulpit Interactive/ACLU poll found that 83% of Americans, across party lines, considered the war on drugs a failure, and 12% considered it a success.

=== Legality ===
The legality of drug prohibition within the US has been challenged on various grounds. One argument holds that drug prohibition, as presently implemented, violates the substantive due process doctrine in that its benefits do not justify the encroachments on rights that are supposed to be guaranteed by the Fifth and Fourteenth Amendments to the US Constitution. Another argument interprets the Commerce Clause to mean that drugs should be regulated in state law not federal law. A third argument states that the reverse burden of proof in drug-possession cases is incompatible with the rule of law, in that the power to convict is effectively taken from the courts and given to those who are willing to plant evidence.

== Efficacy ==
There is no clear measure of the effectiveness of the war on drugs, and it has been widely called a policy failure. (Note: News media, scholarly studies, government officials and leaders, and a variety of NGOs have determined the war on drugs to be a policy failure.) Thirty years into the campaign, a National Research Council report, "Informing America's Policy on Illegal Drugs" (2001), found that "existing drug-use monitoring systems are strikingly inadequate to support the full range of policy decisions that the nation must make." The report noted that studies of efforts to address drug usage and smuggling, from US military operations to eradicate coca fields in Colombia, to domestic drug treatment centers, had all been inconclusive, if the programs had been evaluated at all. The report concluded, "It is unconscionable for this country to continue to carry out a public policy of this magnitude and cost without any way of knowing whether and to what extent it is having the desired effect."

Writing in the New Statesmen in 2021, journalist James Bloodworth stated, "The war on drugs is a failure. We know this. We've long known it. In fact, there is such an abundance of evidence for its failure that we have more certainty here than in most areas of policy. ... According to the International Drug Policy Consortium there was a 31 per cent global increase in drug taking between 2011 and 2016. ... It is impossible to suppress the demand for drugs." He quoted Helen Clark, former prime minister of New Zealand and head of the Global Commission on Drug Policy: "The total elimination of drugs? Dream on, there's never been a time in human history where human beings haven't resorted to some kind of substances that will take them out of their current reality for whatever reason."

By 2026, the US had spent well over $1 trillion on the war on drugs since 1971. It has failed to decrease the number of drugs flowing into the United States or internationally; it has also failed to decrease the number of drug users in the United States. One report found a 26% increase in overall drug use from 2010 to 2020; another found that cocaine use in the US has consistently stayed at around 1.5-2 million users since the 1990s. Attempts to cut off the drug trade at its source have overwhelmingly failed.

=== Interdiction ===
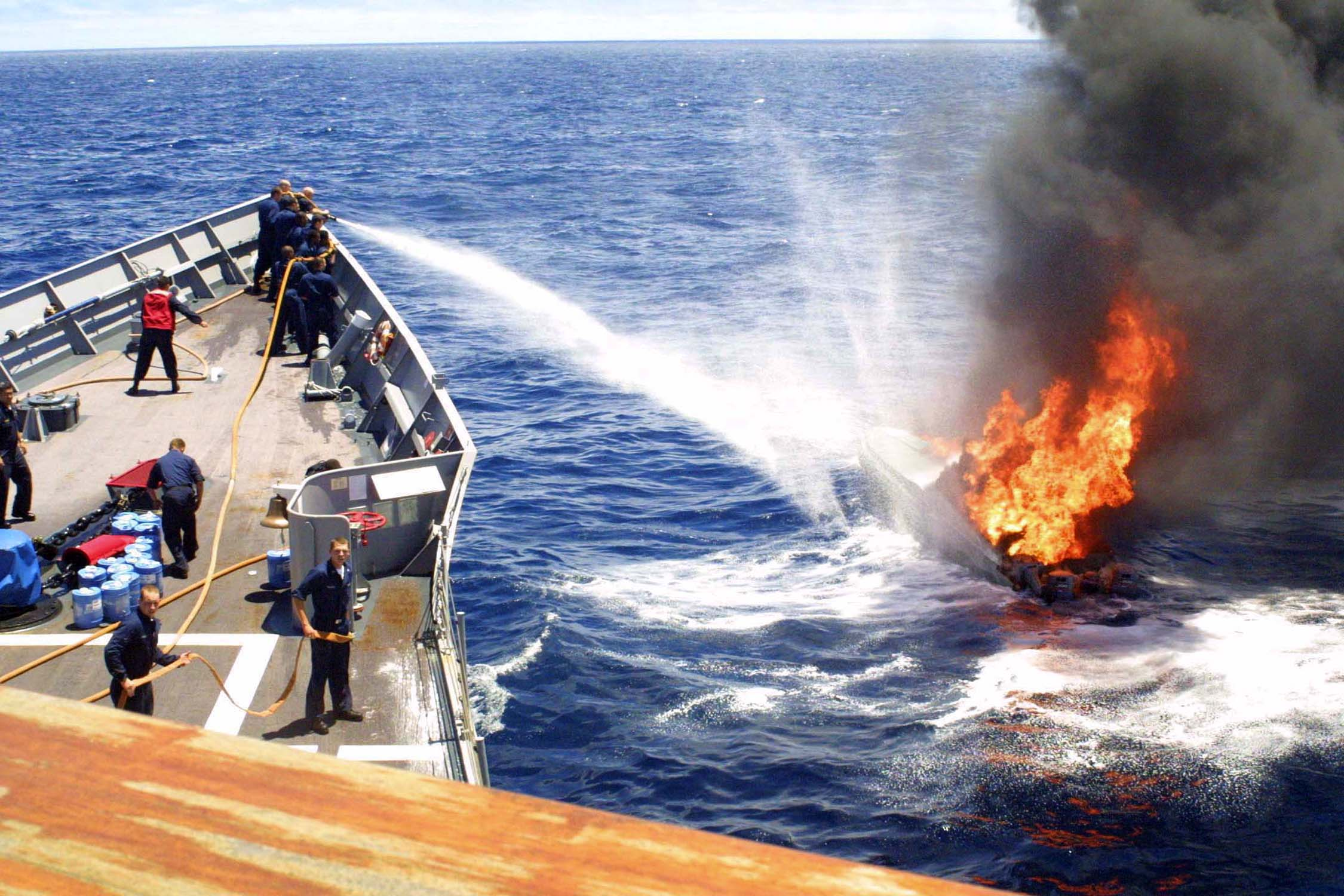
USS Rentz (FFG-46) attempts to put out a fire set by drug smugglers trying to escape and destroy evidence.

External videos
- A Conversation with President Obama and David Simon (The Wire creator), discussing The Wire and the war on drugs, the White House

In 1988, the RAND Corporation released a Department of Defense-funded two-year study, Sealing the Borders: The Effects of Increased Military Participation in Drug Interdiction. It concluded that the use of the armed forces to interdict drugs coming into the US would have little or no effect on cocaine traffic and might, in fact, raise the profits of cocaine cartels and manufacturers. It noted that seven prior studies, including one by the Center for Naval Research and the Office of Technology Assessment, had come to similar conclusions.

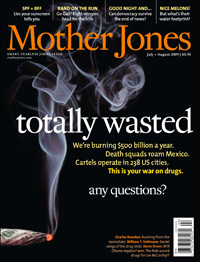
2009 Mother Jones magazine cover

In mid-1995, the US government tried to reduce the supply of methamphetamine precursors to disrupt the market of this drug. According to a 2009 study, this effort was successful, but its effects were largely temporary.

In the six years from 2000 to 2006, the US spent $4.7 billion on Plan Colombia, an effort to eradicate coca production in Colombia. The main result of this effort was to shift coca production into more remote areas and force other forms of adaptation. The overall acreage cultivated for coca in Colombia at the end of the six years was found to be the same, after the US Drug Czar's office announced a change in measuring methodology in 2005 and included new areas in its surveys. Cultivation in the neighboring countries of Peru and Bolivia increased, some would describe this effect like squeezing a balloon.

Richard Davenport-Hines, in his book The Pursuit of Oblivion, criticized the efficacy of the war on drugs by pointing out that "10–15% of illicit heroin and 30% of illicit cocaine is intercepted. Drug traffickers have gross profit margins of up to 300%. At least 75% of illicit drug shipments would have to be intercepted before the traffickers' profits were hurt."

Alberto Fujimori, president of Peru from 1990 to 2000, described US foreign drug policy as "failed": "For 10 years, there has been a considerable sum invested by the Peruvian government and another sum on the part of the American government, and this has not led to a reduction in the supply of coca leaf offered for sale. Rather, in the 10 years from 1980 to 1990, it grew 10-fold."

According to a report commissioned by the Drug Policy Alliance, and released in March 2006 by the Justice Policy Institute, harsher sentences for drug offenses committed in drug-free school zones are ineffective at keeping youths away from drugs and instead create strong racial disparities in the judicial system.

According to data collected by the Federal Bureau of Prisons 45.3% of all criminal charges were drug related and 25.5% of sentences for all charges last 5–10 years. Furthermore, non-whites make up 41.4% of the federal prison system's population and over half are under the age of 40. The Bureau of Justice Statistics states that over 80% of all drug related charges are for mere possession rather than the sale or manufacture of drugs.

=== Drug use ===
In 2005, the federally funded Monitoring the Future annual survey reported about 85% of high school seniors found marijuana "easy to obtain", virtually unchanged since 1975, never dropping below 82.7% in three decades of national surveys. The DEA stated that the number of users of cannabis in the US declined between 2000 and 2005, even with many states passing new medical cannabis laws, making access easier, though usage rates remain higher than they were in the 1990s according to the National Survey on Drug Use and Health.

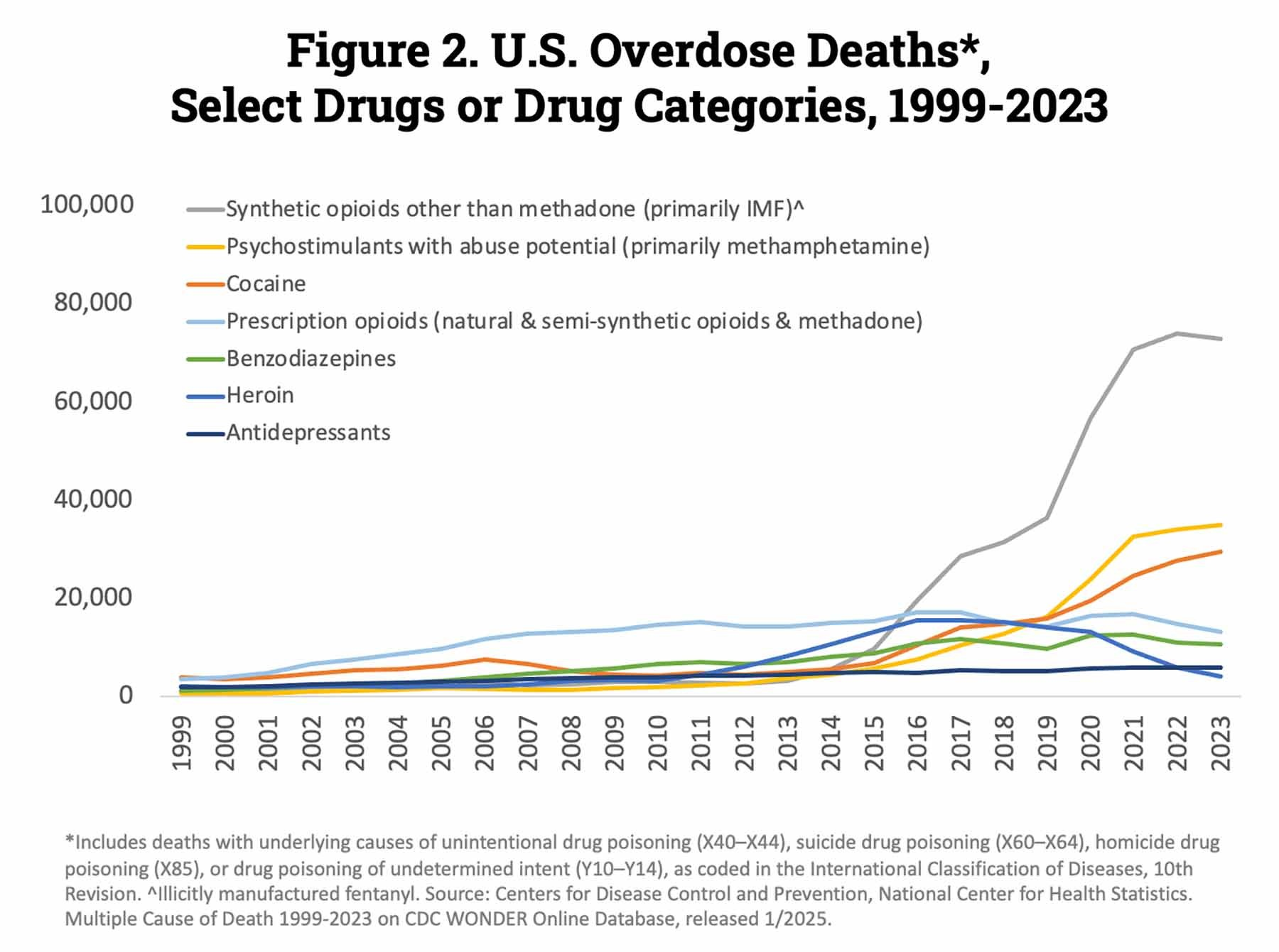
US yearly overdose deaths, and the drugs involved. There were around 110,500 drug overdose deaths overall in 2022 in the US.

The ONDCP stated in April 2011 that there had been a 46% drop in cocaine use among young adults over the previous five years, and a 65% drop in the rate of people testing positive for cocaine in the workplace since 2006. At the same time, a 2007 study found that up to 35% of college undergraduates used stimulants not prescribed to them.

A 2013 study found that prices of heroin, cocaine and cannabis had decreased from 1990 to 2007, while the purity of these drugs had increased.

The National Survey on Drug Use and Health for 2019 found that 1.7% of US adults over 25 had used cocaine in the previous 12 months, compared to 1.8% in 2002, and cannabis use went from 7% in 2002 to 15.2%. The DEA's 2021 National Drug Threat Assessment stated that "a steady supply of cocaine was available throughout domestic markets" in 2019 and 2020.

According to the Centers for Disease Control (CDC), drug abuse fatalities in 2021 reached an all-time high of 108,000 deaths, a 15% increase from 2020 (93,000) which, at the time, was the highest number of deaths and a 30% increase from 2019.

During alcohol prohibition, from 1920 to 1933, alcohol use initially fell but began to increase as early as 1922. It has been extrapolated that even if prohibition had not been repealed in 1933, alcohol consumption would have surpassed pre-prohibition levels. One argument against the war on drugs is that it uses similar measures as Prohibition and is no more effective.

=== Government efficiency ===
In 1997, Rolling Stone published a comprehensive snapshot of the US government's implementation of the war on drugs, spanning 44 federal agencies and hundreds of thousands of government workers, and without unified management, oversight, or cohesive strategy. Among the agencies there were over a dozen separate drug intelligence operations. The White House's Office of National Drug Control Policy, home of the drug czar and ostensibly the coordinating agency, had a staff of 150, and a $36 million budget; the overall federal drug war budget for 1998 was $16 billion. Most of the agencies involved did not report to the ONDCP, instead to one of 13 congressional appropriations subcommittees. The largest single share of the budget, $2 billion, went to the Bureau of Prisons. Federal agencies also passed on billions of anti-drug dollars to the states, with little oversight or accountability. In 2024, the ONDCP requested $461 million of a $46 billion federal budget allocated across some 50 federal agencies.

== Criticisms ==
The war on drugs has faced increasingly intense criticism as its failures have become more apparent throughout the years, both from formal and informal establishments.

Prohibition has resulted in high incarceration rates in the United States, something which has disproportionately impacted black communities.

In Narconomics: How to Run a Drug Cartel, author Tom Wainwright argues that prohibiting drugs increases consumer risk, because an unregulated black market supply chain allow traffickers to cut their product with other dangerous substances to increase profits.

In the book Drug War Capitalism (2014), by journalist Dawn Paley, the war on drugs is described as a tool for the US to leverage control and power over Latin America. Paley argues that the US has increasingly been able to militarize parts of Latin America under the pretext of combating drugs, when in reality the goal has been to oppress local communities and open new lands to extract the region's vast mineral and oil wealth. Increased paramilitary, private military, and national sector (police and military force) violence against local communities coincides with economically significant regions in countries like Colombia, areas either with vast mineral wealth or where oil pipelines run through. Paley points to major joint security initiatives involving the US and Latin American countries, such as Plan Colombia with Colombia, and the Mérida Initiative with Mexico, which both resulted in increased extraction of natural resources, increased militarization, and a weakened justice system. This occurred while the plans' prohibitionary aims, to combat drug trafficking levels and drug cartels, completely failed.

== Alternatives ==
Alternatives to the predominantly punitive, law enforcement approach to the war on drugs in the US fall under two broad categories: a public health orientation built around education, prevention and treatment, and decriminalization or legalization with regulation similar to the handling of alcohol. Jefferson Fish has edited scholarly collections of articles offering a wide variety of public health-based and rights-based alternative drug policies.

=== A public-health approach ===
A common critical view holds that the war on drugs has been costly and ineffective largely because US federal and state governments have chosen the wrong methods, focusing on interdiction and punishment rather than regulation and treatment of drug abuse and addiction. In the US, current public health-oriented interventions include harm reduction, drug courts, and Law Enforcement Assisted Diversion (LEAD) programs which give police treatment or social services options rather than arrest with minor drug offenses. Harm reduction approaches include provision of sterile syringes, medically supervised injection sites (SIF), and availability of the opioid overdose-countering drug naloxone.

As an alternative to imprisonment, drug courts in the US identify substance-abusing offenders and place them under strict court monitoring and community supervision, as well as provide them with long-term treatment services. According to a National Drug Court Institute report, 16.4% of the nation's drug court graduates are rearrested and charged with a felony within one year of completing the program; overall 44.1% of released prisoners end up back in prison within one year. The drug court program is also significantly cheaper than imprisonment. Annual per offender cost is $20,000–$50,000 for imprisonment, and $2,500–$4,000 in the drug court system.

A survey by the Substance Abuse and Mental Health Services Administration (SAMHSA) found that substance abusers who remain in treatment longer are less likely to resume their former drug habits. Of the people studied, 66% were cocaine users. After experiencing long-term in-patient treatment, only 22% returned to the use of cocaine.

During the 1990s, the Clinton administration commissioned a major cocaine policy study by the RAND Drug Policy Research Center. The report recommended that $3 billion be switched from federal and local law enforcement to treatment, concluding that treatment is the cheapest way to cut drug use, and twenty-three times more effective than the supply-side war on drugs.

=== Decriminalization and legalization ===
In a 2023 UN report, the UN High Commissioner for Human Rights stated that "decades of punitive, 'war on drugs' strategies had failed to prevent an increasing range and quantity of substances from being produced and consumed", described punitive drug policies as a failure, and called for an approach "based on health and human rights, including through the legal regulation of drugs".

In 2007, "An Open Letter to the President, Congress, Governors, and State Legislatures" signed by over 550 economists, including Nobel Laureates Milton Friedman, George Akerlof and Vernon L. Smith, endorsed the findings of a 2006 paper, "The Budgetary Implications of Marijuana Prohibition", by Harvard economist Jeffrey A. Miron. Comparing the cost of prohibition to the tax revenue if cannabis was taxed as regular consumer good, or similarly to alcohol, the letter stated that the budgetary impact, considered alongside evidence that "suggests prohibition has minimal benefits and may itself cause substantial harm", favors "a regime in which marijuana is legal but taxed and regulated like other goods". Miron's paper additionally projected a savings of $7.7 billion per year in local, state and federal government expenditure on prohibition enforcement.

In "The Budgetary Impact of Ending Drug Prohibition", a 2010 report co-authored by Miron, the annual savings on enforcement and incarceration costs from the legalization of drugs is stated as roughly $41.3 billion, with $25.7 billion being saved among the states and over $15.6 billion accrued for the federal government. Miron further estimated at least $46.7 billion in tax revenue based on rates comparable to those on tobacco and alcohol: $8.7 billion from marijuana, $32.6 billion from cocaine and heroin, and $5.4 billion from other drugs. A RAND Corporation study from the year before suggested that if marijuana were legalized in California and the drug spilled from there to other states, Mexican drug cartels would lose about a fifth of their annual income of some $6.5 billion from illegal exports to the United States.

Regarding economic arguments for legalization that make a comparison with alcohol, a 2013 study noted that the $14.6 billion in annual alcohol tax collected at the US federal and state levels represented less than 10% of the estimated $185 billion of alcohol-related health care, criminal justice and lost productivity costs.

== See also ==
- Baker, a series of counter-narcotics training exercises conducted by the United States Army and several Asian countries
- Drugs in the United States
- Latin American drug legalization
- Law Enforcement Action Partnership
- November Coalition
- Mexican drug war
- Colombian conflict
- Internal conflict in Peru
- Ecuadorian security crisis
- Philippine drug war
- Smoke and Mirrors: The War on Drugs and the Politics of Failure
- Victimless crime
- War on gangs
- Narcoterrorism

Covert activities and foreign policy

- Allegations of CIA drug trafficking
- CIA transnational anti-crime and anti-drug activities
