= Donald Marshall =

Donald, Don or Donnie Marshall may refer to:

- Donald Marshall Sr. (1925–1991), Grand Chief of the Mi'kmaq
- Donald Albert Marshall (born 1932), Canadian politician in the Legislative Assembly of British Columbia
- Donnie Marshall (1932–2024), Canadian ice hockey player
- Don Marshall (actor) (1936–2016), American actor
- Donald Marshall Jr. (1953–2009), Canadian Mi'kmaq man wrongly convicted of murder, son of Donald Marshall Sr.
- Donnie R. Marshall, American federal agent, administrator of the Drug Enforcement Administration
- Ginger Johnson (drag queen) (Donald Marshall, born 1988/89), British drag queen
