= Conrad Olson =

Conrad Olson may refer to:

- Conrad P. Olson (1882–1952), American politician and judge in Oregon
- Conrad Olson (Minnesota politician) (1895–1953), member of the Minnesota Senate
