= Joy Olson =

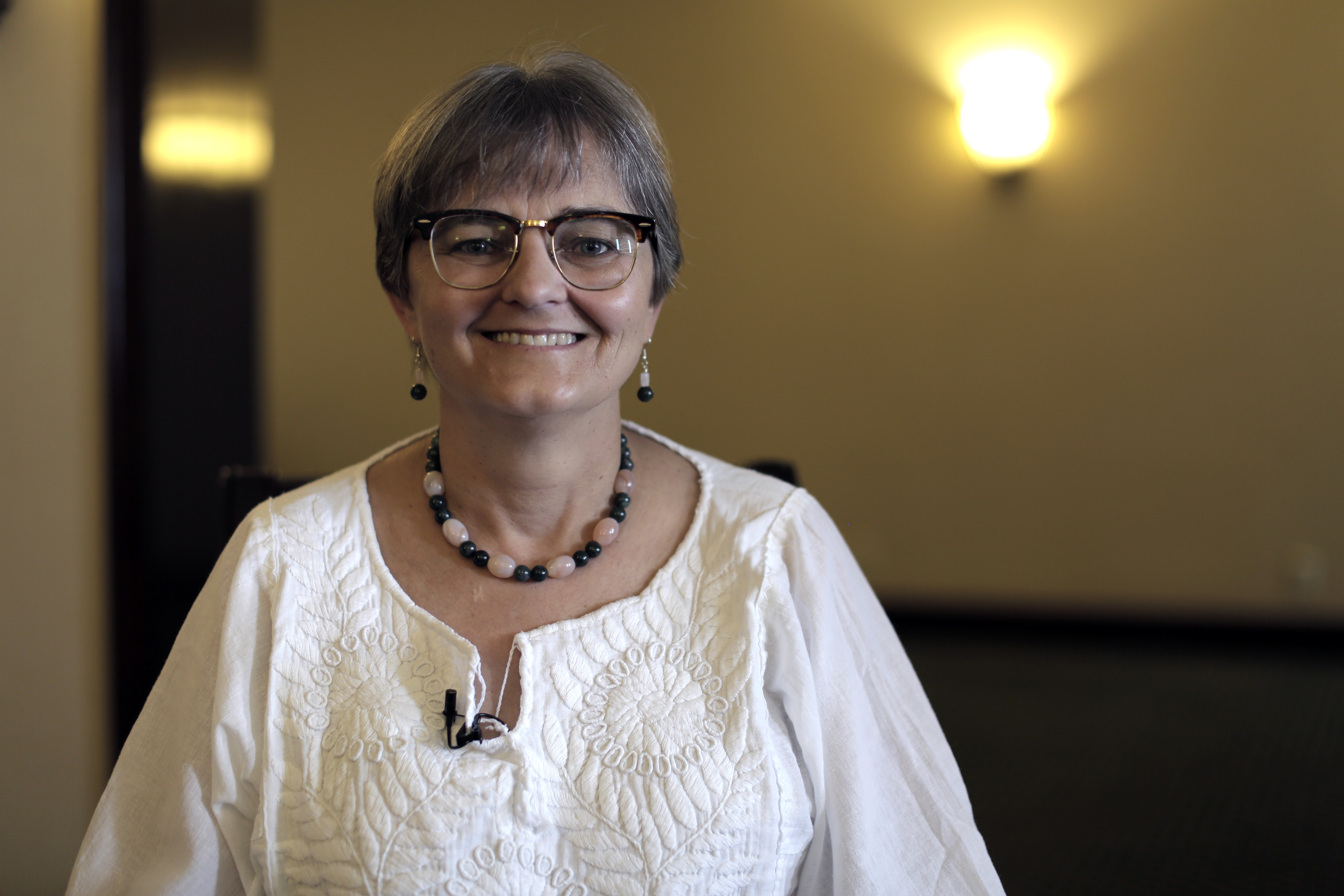
Joy Olson in 2017

Joy Olson is an expert on human rights and U.S. policy toward Latin America, who was Executive Director of The Washington Office on Latin America (WOLA) between 2003 and 2016.

== Education ==
Olson received her bachelor's degree in history from Trinity College and earned a master's in Latin American studies from the National Autonomous University of Mexico, following two years' work in community development in Honduras.

== Work history ==
Prior to joining WOLA, Ms. Olson directed the Latin America Working Group (LAWG), a coalition of sixty non-governmental organizations working to promote peaceful and just U.S. foreign policy toward Latin America. Her many accomplishments include leading NGO efforts to increase U.S. funding for Central American peace accords implementation and a successful advocacy effort to lift the ban on food and medicine sales to Cuba. In the 1980s she worked on immigration and refugees issues and developed legislation to suspend the deportation of Salvadoran refugees from the United States.

== Current work ==
Under Olson's direction, the WOLA is described as pioneering new approaches to human rights advocacy, focusing on the underlying causes of injustice, inequality, and violence. The Washington Post has recognized WOLA as one of the best-managed non-profits in the Washington area.

Olson's special expertise is in the area of military and security policy. She has been a long-time advocate for greater transparency of military programs in Latin America. She co-founded the Just the Facts project, which makes information about U.S. military policy in Latin America publicly accessible. For more than a decade, she has co-authored an annual study on trends in U.S. security assistance, including the recent report Waiting for Change. Olson has testified before Congress on Latin America policy issues ranging from human rights in Mexico to drug policy to the problems of poverty and inequality in the region. She is a frequent commentator in the media, including CNN, CNN Español, the BBC, the Lehrer News Hour, National Public Radio, and an array of national and international news outlets.
