= Washington Office on Latin America =

American human rights NGO

Washington Office on Latin America (WOLA)
- Founded: 1974
- Type: Non-profit; NGO
- Location: Washington, D.C.
- Fields: Human rights, advocacy
- Website: wola.org

The Washington Office on Latin America (WOLA) is a United States non-governmental organization (NGO) that aims to promote human rights, democracy, and social and economic justice in Latin America and the Caribbean.

The Washington Office on Latin America aims to facilitate dialogue between governmental and non-governmental actors, to monitor the impact of U.S. foreign policy on human rights, democracy and equitable development in Latin America, and to promote alternatives through reporting and advocacy. It reports on these activities in order to inform and educate policy-makers, religious and non-governmental organizations, and the general public about their impact.

== History ==
WOLA was founded in 1974 after the 1973 Chilean coup d'état. The first long-term executive director of the organization was Joseph Eldridge, who is currently the chaplain for American University. In its early years, some of WOLA's contacts were priests and nuns who lived in Latin America and bore witness to the events there.

WOLA has provided U.S. citizens and policy-makers with information about Latin America. It informs the U.S. government about the effects of U.S. policy on the region. It facilitates communications and helps to sponsor visits from Latin Americans with expertise and experiences in human rights.

In 1975, WOLA acted as advisors for congressional staff for the drafting of the first major legislation that put conditions on U.S. military aid abroad regarding human-rights practices.

In 2003, Joy Olson was named Executive Director, a position she held until 2016.

== Activities ==
In 2010, WOLA made a presentation to the House Committee on Ways and Means on U.S.-Cuba Policy.

The organization works on issues such as drug policy, rural development, violence against women, organized crime and the rights of internally displaced people. Its focuses are split between nations and issues of health and security across the nations. It operates within four networks of non-governmental organizations: the human rights community, the foreign policy community, academic think-tanks, and the community of peace, justice, solidarity and religious-based organizations.

== Funding ==
WOLA is funded by a combination of foreign governments, foundations, and private individuals. Its largest donors include the Royal Norwegian Ministry of Foreign Affairs, Swiss Federal Department of Foreign Affairs, and Swiss Agency for Development and Cooperation, along with the Ford Foundation, the MacArthur Foundation, Open Society Foundations, the Atlantic Philanthropies, the Libra Foundation, and the Seattle International Foundation.
