= Conrad Olson (Minnesota politician) =

American lawyer and politician

Conrad Olson (January 9, 1895 – October 15, 1953) was an American lawyer and politician.

Olson was born in Saint Paul, Minnesota, and graduated from Saint Paul Central High School. He served in the United States Navy during World War I. Conrad went to Macalester College and then received his law degree from St. Paul College of Law (William Mitchell College of Law) in 1918. He lived in Saint Paul with his wife and family and practiced law. Olson served as the Saint Paul Municipal Court judge from 1922 to 1926. He then served in the Minnesota Senate from 1927 to 1930. Olson worked for the Northern Pacific Railway in Saint Paul, Minnesota and then died while at his desk at the Northern Pacific Railway office at Saint Paul.
