= Central America Regional Security Initiative =

US security assistance to Central America

The Central America Regional Security Initiative (CARSI) is a US foreign security assistance program for Central American countries – Belize, Costa Rica, El Salvador, Guatemala, Honduras, Nicaragua, and Panama – that provides equipment, training, and technical support for law enforcement efforts, and programs intended to strengthen each country's long-term capacity to handle security issues and their underlying conditions. CARSI was initially part of the Mérida Initiative, which included Mexico and Central America, established in 2008 by President George W. Bush. Under Barack Obama, CARSI was created as a standalone program in 2010.

== Background ==
In 2007, President Bush traveled to Mexico and Central America. During the trip, drug trafficking and the rapid rise in crime and violence were the main discussion topics. The openness of the respective governments to addressing these issues led to Bush creating a security assistance package, named the Mérida Initiative. Obama and Congress relaunched the Central American part of the Initiative in 2010 as CARSI.

== Objectives and implementation ==
The US Department of State stated five main goals for CARSI:

1. Create safe streets for the citizens in the region.
2. Disrupt the movement of criminals and contraband within and between the nations of Central America.
3. Support the development of strong, capable and accountable Central American governments.
4. Re-establish effective state presence and security in communities at risk.
5. Foster enhanced levels of security and rule of law coordination and cooperation between the nations of the region.

Most of the funding is managed by the Department of State and the US Agency for International Development (USAID). Other agencies and sub-agencies involved in program implementation include the Department of Defense (DOD); the Department of the Treasury; the Department of Homeland Security (DHS); Immigration and Customs Enforcement (ICE); Customs and Border Protection (CBP); the Coast Guard; the Department of Justice (DOJ); the Federal Bureau of Investigation (FBI); the Drug Enforcement Administration (DEA); the Bureau of Alcohol, Tobacco, Firearms and Explosives (ATF); and the Office of Overseas Prosecutorial Development, Assistance and Training (OPDAT).

== Programs ==
In the area of law enforcement and counternarcotics, CARSI efforts included equipment and investigative support. In Guatemala, helicopters were provided to allow security forces rapid access to hard-to-reach areas. FBI-led Transnational Anti-Gang (TAG) units were established in several countries. Investigations have been undertaken into money laundering, cash smuggling; and trafficking in drugs, weapons, and people.

Various programs addressed strengthening law enforcement and justice institutions for the long-term. These include: assessing and creating community policing, forensic labs, wiretapping centers, and criminal investigation schools; establishing intelligence-gathering systems; and training and technical assistance for prosecution and court and prison management.

Prevention programs, addressing underlying causes, included providing educational, recreational, and vocational opportunities for at-risk youth. Implementation focused on the local municipal level, with over 120 community outreach centers created.

== Funding ==
In fiscal years 2008 to 2011, the State Department provided $361.5 million in assistance to Central American countries through the Mérida Initiative and CARSI. Through 2012, the largest share of funding was divided between the "northern triangle" countries of Guatemala (22.5%), Honduras (17.3%), and El Salvador (16.3%), followed by Panama (10.4%), Costa Rica (6.9%), Belize (3.9%), Nicaragua (3.9%), and regional initiatives (19.6%); after 2012, the State Department did not make public the distribution breakdown, but reported that the northern triangle continued to receive the majority of funds. For fiscal 2024, the Biden administration requested $341.3 million for CARSI.

== Results ==
As of 2015, little information on the impact of CARSI had been made publicly available. David Rosnick, Alexander Main, and Laura Jung of the Center for Economic Policy Research described it as "a notoriously opaque regional assistance scheme." Some evaluations indicated positive results in particular communities. Overall, security indicators at the country level had not shown significant improvements.

A 2014 USAID-sponsored report by Vanderbilt University's Latin America Public Opinion Project (LAPOP) found that the program was generally effective at reducing crime in the neighborhoods that they studied. Specifically they found that perceptions of crime decreased significantly. For example, perceptions of murders decreased by 51%, robberies by 19%, and reports of drug sales dropped by 25%. These findings were rebutted by a report from David Rosnick, Alexander Main, and Laura Jung at the Center for Economic Policy Research. They write "This report examines the data collected during the LAPOP study and subjects them to a number of statistical tests. The authors find that the study cannot support the conclusion that the areas subject to treatment in the CARSI programs showed better results than those areas that were not."

The Wilson Center was more critical of the program. They wrote in 2014, "Both the Honduras and Guatemala paper identify some areas of modest success for the CARSI program... However, both studies also identify areas of considerable weakness for CARSI programs... Overall, the studies find that CARSI does not reflect an integrated strategy for addressing the critical security threats in Central America and thus has had negligible impact on the factors driving the increased Central American migration since 2011."

In 2023, a Congressional Research Service report noted about the broader region: "In the past few years, U.S. assistance efforts in Latin America and the Caribbean have expanded as many countries ... have seen setbacks in long-term development and new challenges have emerged. Socioeconomic conditions began to stagnate in many Latin American and Caribbean countries around 2015 ... These conditions deteriorated sharply in 2020 as the COVID-19 pandemic swept away more than a decade of development gains. Political conditions also have deteriorated as governments in Venezuela and Nicaragua have entrenched authoritarian rule ... These challenges have contributed to political unrest and large-scale migration flows throughout Latin America and the Caribbean."

== See also ==
- Gang violence in Belize
