= Thomas A. Constantine =

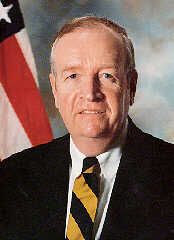

6th Administrator of the Drug Enforcement Administration
- In office April 1994 – July 2, 1999
- President: Bill Clinton
- Preceded by: Stephen H. Greene (Acting)
- Succeeded by: Donnie R. Marshall

10th Superintendent of the New York State Police
- In office January 2, 1987 – March 21, 1994
- Governor: Mario Cuomo
- Preceded by: Donald Osborn Chesworth Jr.
- Succeeded by: James W. McMahon

Personal details
- Born: December 23, 1938 Buffalo, New York
- Died: May 3, 2015 (aged 76) Pinehurst, North Carolina
- Education: St. Joseph's Collegiate Academy

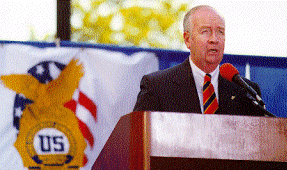
Tom Constantine addressing an audience at the DEA 25th anniversary luncheon, 1998

Thomas A. Constantine (December 23, 1938 – May 3, 2015) served as the 6th Administrator of the Drug Enforcement Administration (DEA) from March 1994 to July 1999.

Constantine was born in Buffalo, New York, on December 23, 1938. He was educated in parochial schools there and was graduated from St. Joseph's Collegiate Academy.

== Early career ==
Following a brief stint at the United States Merchant Marine Academy at King's Point, Long Island, Constantine began his career in law enforcement as a deputy sheriff with the Erie County Sheriff's Department in 1960.

In 1962, Constantine joined the New York State Police (NYSP) as a uniform trooper. Over the course of his 34-year NYSP career, rose through all uniform and investigative ranks, including service as a regional troop commander, headquarters staff inspector, and full colonel in the post of Field Commander in charge of day-to-day operations of both the uniform and investigative branches of the NYSP.

Constantine was nominated by Governor Mario Cuomo in December 1986 to be Superintendent of the NYSP. It was the first time in 30 years that a member of that agency had risen through the ranks from Trooper to Superintendent. During his tenure as Superintendent, the 4,800-member agency earned numerous awards, including the Governor's Excelsior Award as the best quality agency in state government. In 1994, Constantine himself was selected as the Governor's Law Enforcement Executive of the Year. The labor union that represented the State Troopers at the time often complained about his heavy-handed management style.

As Superintendent, Constantine instituted vigorous enforcement programs targeting drunk drivers who were responsible for a majority of the fatal accidents in the state. These high-visibility enforcement programs were credited with a major share of the subsequent reduction of highway fatalities.

Concerned about the impact of violent crime, Constantine instituted the NYSP Forensic Unit, the first of its kind by a domestic law enforcement agency. This program, based in state police headquarters, provided immediate resource support to local law enforcement authorities confronted with suspicious or unsolved murders and violent assaults. Specially trained state police homicide investigators successfully solved a series of serial killer incidents in Rochester, Long Island, Utica, and the Catskill area in the 1990s. The five serial killers arrested were responsible for the murder of 52 innocent victims.

In 1987, the NYSP created and instituted the Colonel Henry F. Williams Homicide Seminar, internationally recognized as the finest homicide training event of its kind. This seminar, conducted annually in Albany, brings together homicide investigators from throughout the world to hear from leading medical, forensic, legal, and investigative experts.

The largest scandal in New York State Police history occurred during his tenure. A number of investigators were found to have falsified latent fingerprint evidence under pressure from their supervisors to garner convictions. At least two investigators were criminally convicted and the scandal had a chilling effect throughout the nationwide law enforcement community. After Special Prosecutor Nelson Roth issued his report Constantine had already left the State Police.

As Superintendent, Constantine recognized the need for increased law enforcement resources to combat the growing drug problem. During his tenure, the NYSP Narcotics Unit was increased from 75 to 400 full-time narcotics investigators. Working closely with the DEA, particularly through the New York Drug Enforcement Task Force, these expanded drug units targeted the major drug organizations from Cali, Colombia, that were responsible for the flood of cocaine into New York. Four regional teams of undercover troopers were established in upstate New York to assist local agencies confront drug dealers. These Community Narcotics Enforcement Teams brought an unprecedented level of law enforcement resources to bear on beleaguered inner city communities beset by the crack cocaine epidemic.

Largely as the result of Constantine's emphasis on drug enforcement and maximized use of tough new federal laws that allowed seizure of criminal assets, his administration of the NYSP brought in seized assets that ultimately financed the construction of a state-of-the-art forensic investigative center at the NYSP headquarters in Albany.

== DEA ==
Constantine's performance caught the attention of Attorney General Janet Reno and FBI Director Louis Freeh. On their recommendation, he was appointed Administrator of the US Drug Enforcement Administration by President Bill Clinton on March 11, 1994.

As Administrator of the DEA, Constantine oversaw a work force of over 8,400 special agents and support staff assigned to the agency's 200 domestic offices and 78 foreign offices in over 55 countries. In this capacity, he focused enforcement efforts against the powerful international organized crime groups that control most of the drug trafficking in the United States and throughout the world. In addition, Constantine created DEA Mobile Enforcement Teams to assist state and local law enforcement with investigative and enforcement operations that target the violent drug gangs that have terrorized so many communities in the United States.

Constantine emphasized the need for increased integrity and ethics standards for all DEA employees. Since 1994, all new DEA special agents have been required to meet the most rigorous entrance standards in U.S. law enforcement. In order to provide more assets to the field operational units, the headquarters decision-making and staffing levels were reduced with an emphasis on decentralized authority. In recognition of these successful efforts, Constantine was awarded the 1997 Penrith Award by the National Executive Institute for outstanding law enforcement leadership.

In 1995, the Rodriguez brothers, godfathers of Colombia's notorious Cali Cartel, were brought to face American justice. Beginning in 1985, when Constantine was Field Commander of the New York State Police, he oversaw an effort to expose and dismantle what has been acknowledged to have been the largest and most powerful criminal conspiracy in history. That year, the New York State Police uncovered a cocaine processing lab in the rural New York hamlet of Minden. Constantine consolidated this and several other NYSP drug investigations under a single task force. In 1991, a series of raids across New York resulted in arrests and seizures that effectively exposed the entire Cali Cartel operation in New York. It wasn't long thereafter that Constantine, now head of the DEA, headed up the international law enforcement effort that brought about the defeat and dismantling of the cartel.

On January 5, 1996, Constantine established the DEA Purple Heart Award to honor individuals who had lost their lives or been seriously injured enforcing the drug laws of the United States.

Constantine retired from DEA in July 1999.

== Oversight Commissioner NI ==
In May 2000, Constantine was appointed by the British Government to serve as Oversight Commissioner for a major reform of provincial policing in Northern Ireland. Pursuant to the Good Friday agreement of 1998, a commission chaired by former Hong Kong Governor Chris Patten had issued a plan for the reconstitution and reorganization of the Royal Ulster Constabulary into a new Police Service of Northern Ireland. Constantine's task was to oversee and certify progress on the implementation of the Patten Commission plan. He served in this capacity for three and one half years. In the years since, the Police Service of Northern Ireland has emerged as a respected and trusted law enforcement agency.

== Further information ==
Constantine was active in a number of police organizations including the International Association of Chiefs of Police (IACP). He was elected to and served on the Board of Officers for the IACP from October 1992 to April 1994, and he served as a member of the IACP Executive Committee and as Chairman of the IACP Narcotics and Dangerous Drugs Committee.

Constantine held an associate degree from the Erie Community College, a bachelor's degree from State University College at Buffalo, and a master's degree from the State University of New York at Albany, where he completed the academic portion of his doctoral program. He was selected as the outstanding alumnus of both of the latter. Constantine was later awarded an honorary Doctor of Laws degree from Niagara University (New York) in 1995, an honorary Doctor of Laws degree from Stonehill College (Massachusetts) in 1997 and an Honorary Doctor of Laws from the State University of New York in 2012. In 1999, he joined the faculty of Rockefeller College School of Public Affairs and Policy as a Public Service Professor. In that capacity, he initiated the creation of a college-level executive development training program for municipal police executives that opened its first session in September 2005.

Constantine was married to the former Ruth Ann Cryan of Buffalo. Constantine died on May 3, 2015, in Pinehurst, North Carolina.
