= Donnie R. Marshall =

DES agent

Donnie Marshall
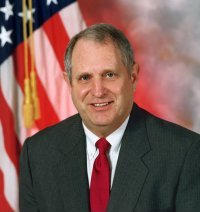

7th Administrator of the Drug Enforcement Administration
- In office July 2, 1999 – June 30, 2001; Acting: July 2, 1999 - June 19, 2000
- President: Bill Clinton; George W. Bush
- Preceded by: Thomas A. Constantine
- Succeeded by: William Simpkins (Acting)

Personal details
- Education: Stephen F. Austin State University

Donnie R. Marshall is an American federal agent who served as the 7th Administrator of the Drug Enforcement Administration (DEA) from 1999 to 2001.

== Early life and education ==
Marshall was born in Dallas, Texas and grew up in San Augustine, Texas. He received a B.S. degree from Stephen F. Austin State University in Nacogdoches, Texas. He worked as a firefighter for the city of Nacogdoches while attending college. Marshall is married to Catherine, a native of Galveston, Texas, and has three children, Emory, Ross and Elissa.

== Career ==
From 1984 to 1986, Marshall served as Assistant Special Agent in Charge of DEA's Dallas Division. He also served as a Senior Inspector in the Office of Professional Responsibility, as the Deputy Regional Director for the Latin America Region, as Country Attache in Brazil, as the Resident Agent in Charge in Austin, and as a Special Agent in Dallas, Texas and Houston, Texas.

He headed DEA's worldwide air operations from 1986 to 1995 as Special Agent in Charge of the Aviation Division. From 1995 to 1996, he was the Chief of Domestic Operations and chaired the Sensitive Activities Review Committee responsible for approving and managing potentially controversial or high-risk operations. From 1996 to 1998 he served as Chief of Operations, with the responsibility of overseeing all daily operations of DEA.

In this capacity, he directed international investigations which resulted in the arrest of important figures in major Mexican and Colombian drug organizations. Marshall began serving as Deputy Administrator in December 1998 and became Acting Administrator in July 1999. Marshall was subsequently nominated by President William J. Clinton to serve as Administrator of Drug Enforcement, was unanimously confirmed by the United States Senate, serving as Administrator until his retirement from government service in July 2001.

== Leadership tenure ==
Under Marshall's leadership, the DEA developed enforcement programs against Mexican drug trafficking organizations at a time when they were becoming the predominant force in illegal drug trafficking in the United States. Marshall also established controls over the drugs ketamine and GHB (gamma-Hydroxybutyric acid.)

Under Marshall's leadership, the DEA disrupted financial and transportation bases of organized crime groups in targeted enforcement operations such as Operation Millennium, Operation Tarpit, Operation Impunity and Impunity II, Operation White Horse and Operation Journey. During Marshall's tenure, DEA also established demand-reduction programs and enforcement programs against ecstasy (MDMA) which was being used at record levels by young people in the U.S. Operation Red Tide dismantled the largest international ecstasy trafficking organization in the world.

== Sources ==
- Donnie R. Marshall Confirmed by Senate as DEA Administrator, Drug Enforcement Administration, May 24, 2000.
