= Gothenburg School of Business, Economics and Law =

Business school of the University of Gothenburg, Sweden

- Handelshögskolan vid Göteborgs universitet
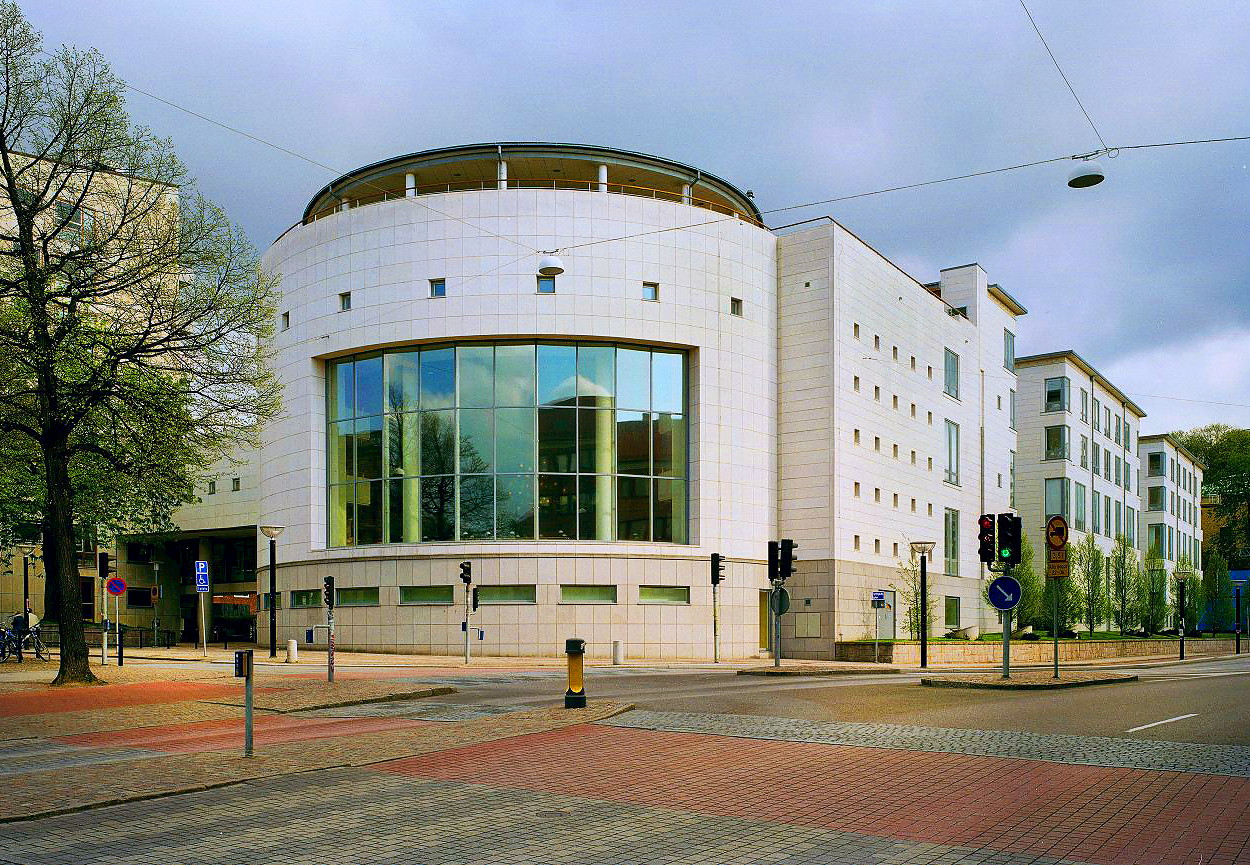
- Type: University of Business UB and law school
- Established: 1923
- Parent institution: University of Gothenburg
- Affiliations: University of Gothenburg EQUIS, AMBA, AACSB
- Chair: Peter Larsson
- Dean: Per Cramér
- Students: 7000
- Location: Gothenburg, Sweden; 57°41′50″N 11°57′40″E
- Website: www.handels.gu.se

The Gothenburg School of Business, Economics and Law at the University of Gothenburg (Swedish: Handelshögskolan vid Göteborgs universitet) is one of Sweden's leading business schools, located in Gothenburg. It was founded in 1923 as an independent business college and is situated in the centre of the city. In 1961, it was integrated into the state-run university system, still as a separate college, but was then integrated into the University of Gothenburg in 1971.

The school holds the Triple Accreditation, i.e. AACSB, AMBA and EQUIS, certifying that all main activities are of the highest international standards.

== Facilities ==
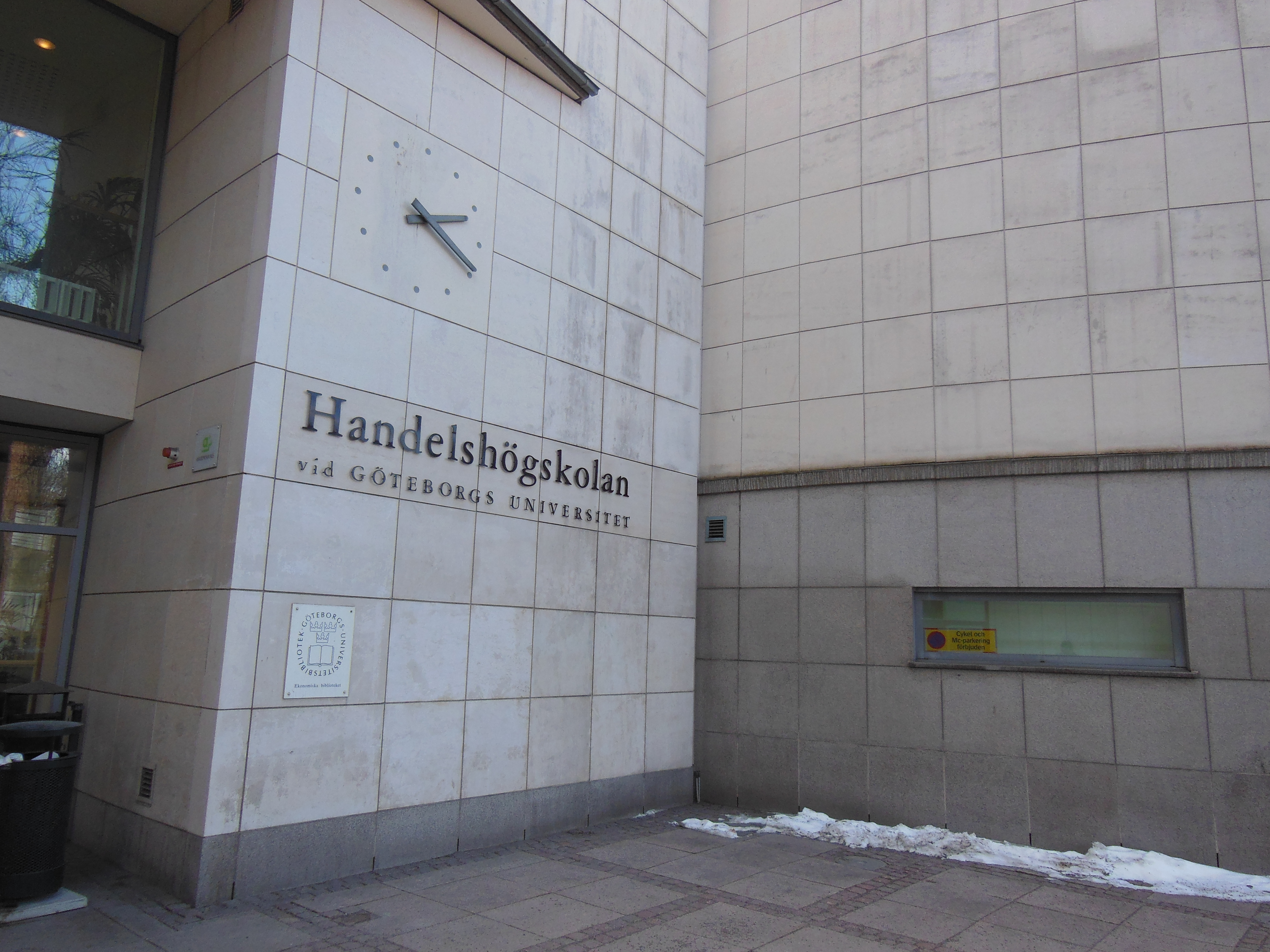
Entrance

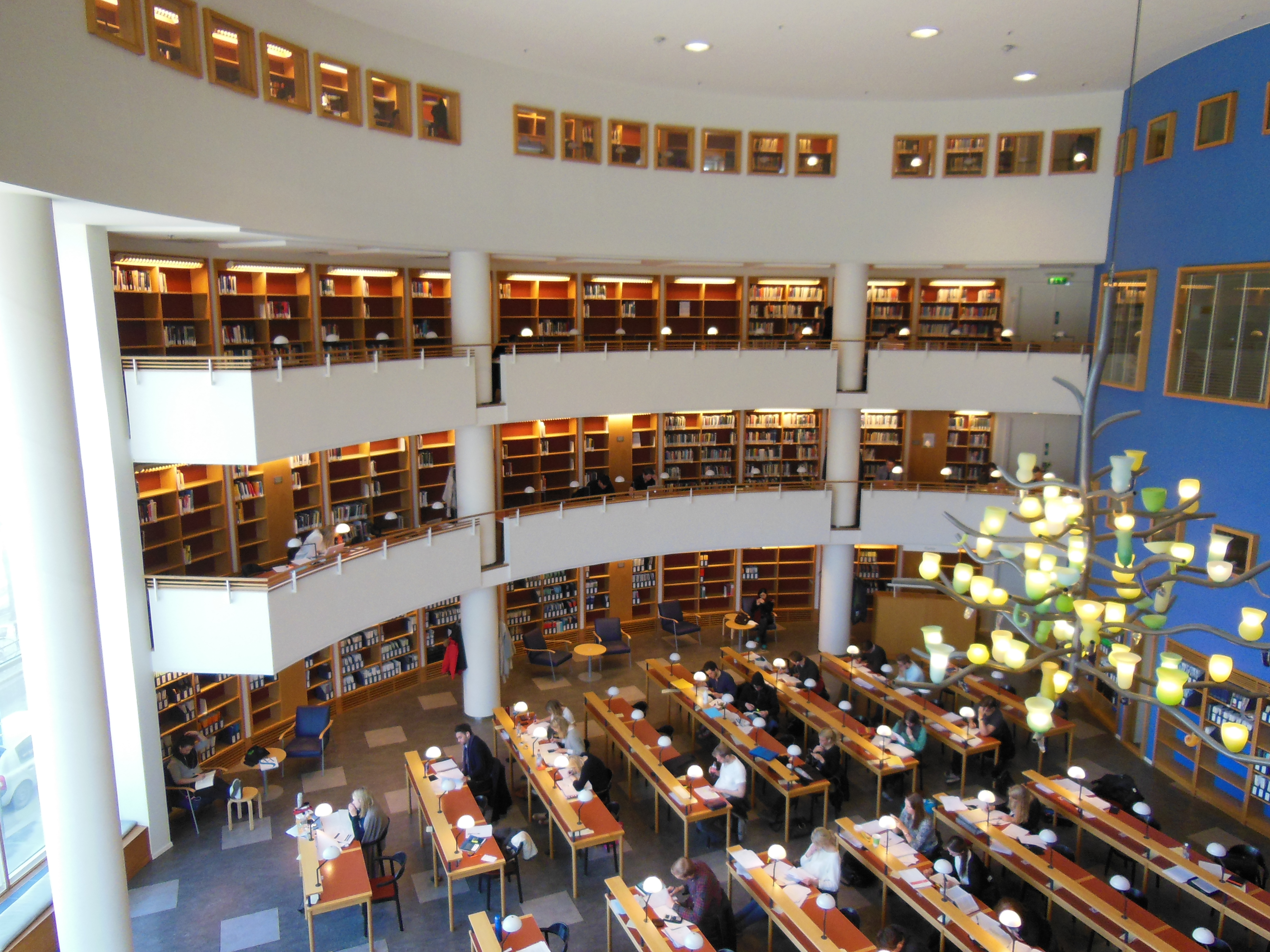
Reading hall

The school relocated to its current premises in central Gothenburg in 1952, the present buildings being inaugurated in 1995, with further work and extensions conducted in 1996, 2003 and 2010. The main campus offers approximately 25,500 square metres of space, hosting lecture halls and office space for faculty members, as well as library facilities, a restaurant and the premises of the school's Student Association.

== Programmes ==
Undergraduate level

- Programme in Business and Economics
- Bachelor Programme in Logistics Management
- Bachelor Programme in Environmental Social Science
- The Social Analysis Programme

Master level (taught in English)

- Executive MBA
- Master in Accounting and Financial Management
- Master in Finance
- Master in Innovation and Industrial Management
- Master in International Business and Trade
- Master in Knowledge-based Entrepreneurship
- Master in Logistics and Transport Management
- Master in Management
- Master in Marketing and Consumption
- Master in Economics
- Master of Laws Programme (in Swedish)

PhD level

- PhD in Business Administration
- PhD in Economic Geography
- PhD in Innovation and Entrepreneurship and Intellectual Asset Management
- PhD in Law
- PhD in Economics
- PhD in Economic History
- PhD in Human Geography

The school was founded in 1923 as a private institution, serving a growing demand for internationally oriented academic and professional education among the manufacturing companies, shipping firms and trading houses of Gothenburg. Gothenburg-based globally oriented companies, such as SKF, Volvo and the leading shipyards, later became major employers of graduates from the school. After several decades of rapid growth in the Swedish economy and thus in the public system of higher education, the school became a public institution under Government auspices in 1960. After its amalgamation with the University of Gothenburg (the University) in 1971, it was recognized as an independent unit within the university in 1986. Since 1997, the school has had its faculty board, reflecting a high degree of sovereignty within the university system. In 1992, the school expanded its activities by adding a Master of Laws programme to its educational options. Its present English name, ‘the School of Business, Economics and Law’, was adopted in 2004 to reflect its three main pillars of research and education.

Over the years, the development of the school has combined consistency and dynamism in a close relationship with the society surrounding it. The school's founders, in creating advanced higher education in Gothenburg, stressed the need for an academic base for the many local merchant firms engaged in overseas shipping and trade. Research conducted in close cooperation with the business community is essential to the school and has been so since its foundation.

The international orientation of businesses headquartered or operating in the area contributes to the school's international focus. Language courses were introduced at the school as far back as the early 1920s, and the emphasis on international business studies led to the creation of Sweden's oldest and largest Bachelor Programme in International Business and Economics, with French as one of the main subjects. Over the years, Spanish, German, Japanese, Chinese and English have been added as optional main languages to what is now known as the Programme in Business and Economics. The successive establishment of an extensive network of cooperation with foreign universities that today includes more than 150 agreements has furthermore strengthened the school's international orientation.

In 2006, the Swedish Government declared that the Bologna system was to be implemented for all higher education. Since 1997, the organisation of Master programmes in English has continued to develop into what today is formally known as the Graduate School, the unit for all education within the second cycle of the Bologna system today delivering nine two-year Master Programmes in Business and Economics.

The school grants degrees at all academic levels and has comprehensive PhD programmes in all its disciplines. The Department of Business Administration – with a strong history of Management and Accounting research dating back to the 1920s – is one of the largest of its kind in the Nordic countries. Today, the school's student body exceeds 4,000 full-time students. The faculty includes 272 researchers and teachers of whom 109 are full professors or associate professors.

== The organisation of the school ==
According to the departmental structure that was to be fully implemented by January 1, 2013, the school is organised into four distinct departments:

- Business Administration
- Economics
- Law
- Economy and Society

The graduate school is an administrative entity outside the departments, with the responsibility for the Executive MBA, Specialised Master Programmes, the Visiting Professor Programme and the school's GMAT Centre. The PhD programmes are the responsibility of the individual departments and not of the Graduate School.

== The faculty board and the school management team ==
The school's faculty board consists of three categories of members; senior management of the school, senior faculty (who form a majority), and representatives for the students and employees appointed by the student association and the trade unions respectively. The dean chairs the board. The faculty board has overall responsibility for:

- Long-term strategy of the school
- Funding and allocation of resources
- Staffing
- Programme options and content
- Research strategies
- Principles for quality assessment

The school management team comprises the dean, the assistant dean and the vice dean. The dean is individually responsible for the executive management of the school, answering to the vice-chancellor of the university. Internally, the dean is in charge of the school's strategy and its relationship with external stakeholders and holds a formal operating responsibility for staff, financial administration and infrastructure. The dean is also a member of the vice-chancellor's management council at the university level. The assistant dean holds the main responsibility for research and postgraduate education, while the vice dean is responsible for master's and bachelor's education. Both the dean and the assistant dean are elected by the school's members of faculty and administrators for six years. The remaining elected members of the faculty board have a three-year mandate. Student and union representatives are appointed by the respective associations.

== Advisory boards and committees ==
To ascertain that all decision-making processes are based on a qualified analysis of correct facts, the school management team and faculty board are backed by several advisory committees and boards. The Swedish Government stipulates that all preparatory and decision-making bodies dealing with educational matters within Swedish universities must have student representation. Accordingly, the Student Association is represented on all these advisory bodies. All vacant academic positions are publicly advertised internationally and candidates are evaluated by external referees for proficiency and merit. An Appointments Board oversees the recruitment and evaluation process, with the final appointment decision being taken by the faculty board. Professors, who hold the highest academic position within the university, are formally appointed by the vice-chancellor following an application's adoption by the faculty board. Research and education activities are discussed and coordinated through two separate preparatory committees. The Preparatory Committee for Research includes representatives from all departments, as well as one PhD student representative, and is responsible for developing common strategies for research, principles for the allocation of research resources between the departments, common principles for quality assessment, etc. The committee is chaired by the Assistant Dean. The Preparatory Committee for Education comprises representatives from all departments, major education units and programmes of the school, as well as one student representative, and handles all major questions regarding education at Bachelor and Master levels. The committee is chaired by the Vice Dean. The Advisory Board – made up of leading management executives from a wide variety of companies such as AB Volvo, Volvo Car Corporation, SKF and Stena, as well as the Swedish financial and public sectors – provides strategic advice to the school management team and practical support. It also functions as a key communication tool with some of the school's most important stakeholders. Some of the Advisory Board members are alumni of the school.

== Research centres ==
In addition to the main intra-disciplinary research groups within the departments, a long-term strategy by the school has also been to build up research capacity within more focused units that are organised multi-disciplinarily. Research centres have been initiated to promote thinking outside the box, and at the same time facilitate active contacts with the business community to cooperate in dealing with applied research which is typical for a specific sector or a specific area.

- Centre for Business in Society
- Centre for Business Solutions
- Centre for Consumer Science
- Centre for Finance
- Centre for Global Human Resource Management
- Centre for Health Economics
- Centre for International Business Studies
- Centre for Regional Analysis
- Centre for Tourism
- Gothenburg Centre for Globalisation and Development

Researchers at the school are also active in cross-faculty centres hosted by other faculties, including:

- Business and Design Lab
- Centre for European Research (CERGU)
- Centre for Intellectual Property (CIP)
- Centre for Environment and Sustainability
- Lighthouse

== Notable alumni ==
- Percy Barnevik (b. 1941), industry leader, former CEO of Asea Brown Boveri and board member of GM
- Carl Bennet, (b. 1951), industry leader, major shareholder and chairman in Elanders, Getinge and Lifco.
- Nils Brunsson, academic and researcher in organizational behavior
- Jan Eliasson (b. 1940), diplomat, Swedish foreign minister
- Camilla Läckberg (b. 1974), crime writer
- Dan Sten Olsson, (b. 1947), industry leader, CEO of Stena AB and chairman in Concordia Maritime AB, Stena Line Holding B.V., Stena Metall AB, Stena Bulk AB, Stena Sessan AB, Stena Drilling Ltd. Also a member of the international advisory board of Alliance for Global Sustainability and an honorary doctorate at the Chalmers University of Technology.
- Leif Pagrotsky (b. 1951), former Minister of Industry and Trade, Minister of Education, and Minister of Culture.
- Melker Schörling, (b. 1947), investor, major shareholder in Securitas AB and Assa Abloy. Also, board members in AarhusKarlshamn AB, Hexagon AB, Hexpol AB and Securitas AB. Chairman and owner of MSAB.
- Leif Östling (b. 1945), industry leader, CEO of Scania AB. Holds also a Master of Engineering (Chalmers University of Technology, Gothenburg).
- Mats Wahlstrom, founder of the Puro hospitality group

== See also ==
- Stockholm School of Economics
- Jönköping International Business School
- Umeå School of Business
- Lund School of Economics and Management
- List of universities in Sweden
- List of business schools in the Nordic countries
