= Carole Freeman (artist) =

Canadian-American artist (born 1954)

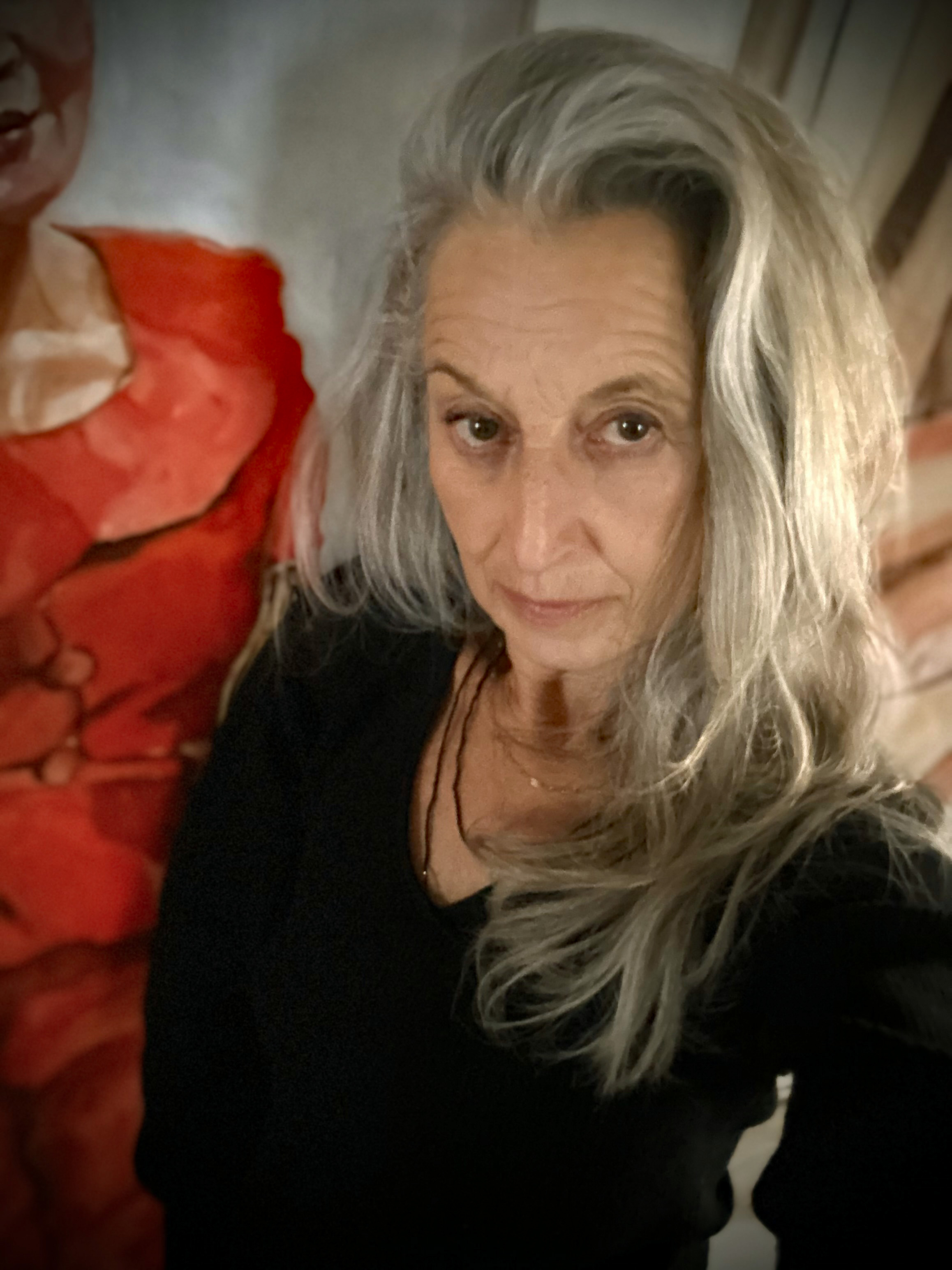
- Born: June 29, 1954 (age 72); St. Boniface, Canada
- Education: Royal College of Art, London, UK
- Known for: Painting
- Website: https://www.carolefreemanart.com/

Carole Freeman is a Canadian American contemporary figurative artist known for expressive realist portraits and narrative paintings characterized by psychological depth, empathy, and close observation. Freeman works in drawing, painting, printmaking and photography.

== Early life and education ==
Freeman was born in St. Boniface, Manitoba in 1954, as the youngest of two brothers and three step-sisters.

Between 1973 and 1977, Freeman studied at the University of Manitoba School of Visual Arts in Winnipeg, Manitoba, her main mentor being Canadian painter Ivan Eyre. She graduated with a Bachelor of Fine Arts Degree Honors.

She continued postgraduate studies at the School of Painting, Royal College of Art in London, England, earning a Master of Arts Degree in 1980. This period expanded her artistic practice and exposed her to art world figures such as Roberto Matta, James Rosenquist, Ernst Gombrich, John Golding, and tutors Peter de Francia, and Ken Kiff.

Freeman later obtained a Bachelor Degree in Education from the University of Toronto in 1991.

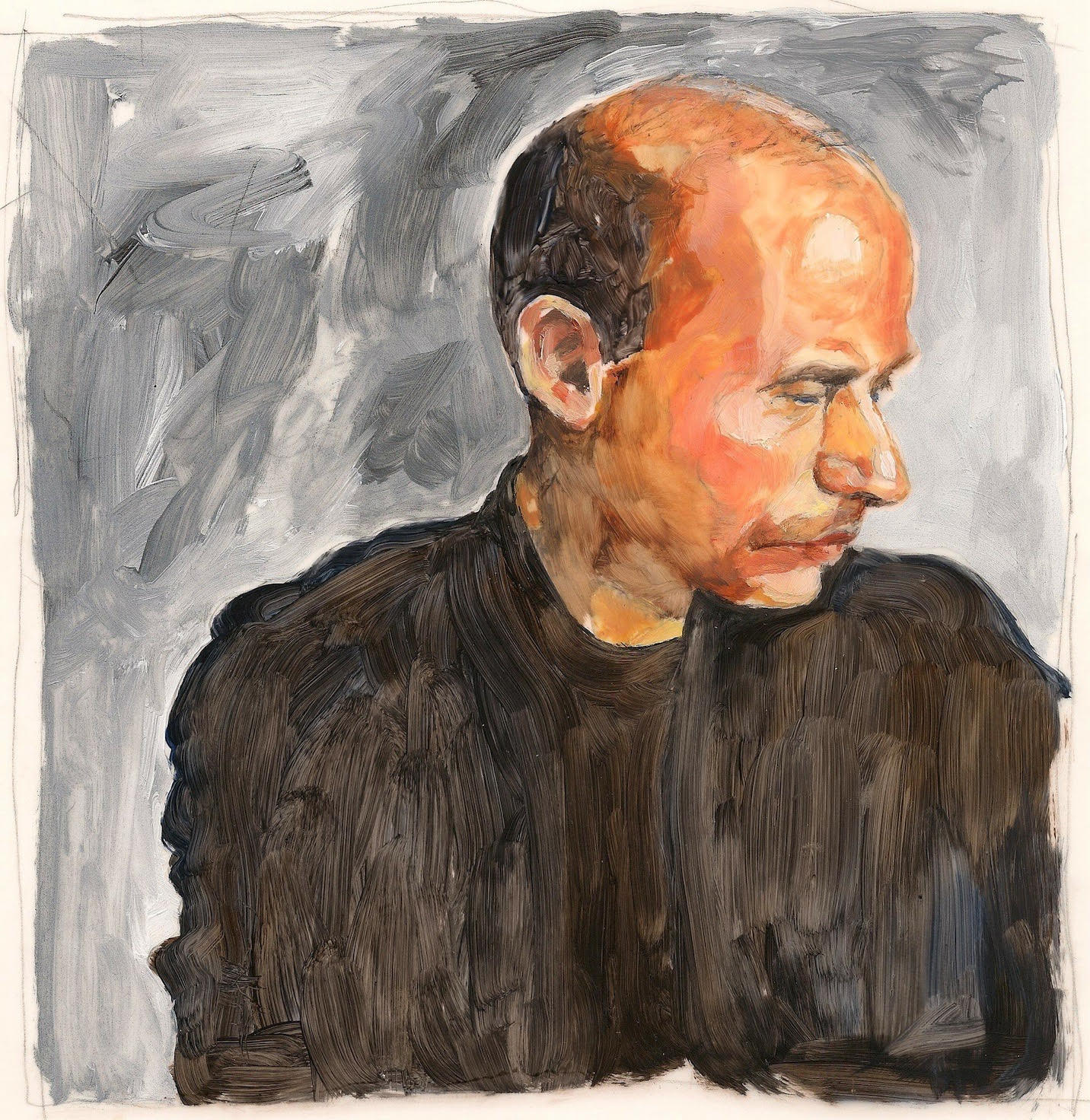
Blake Gopnik by Carole Freeman

== Work ==
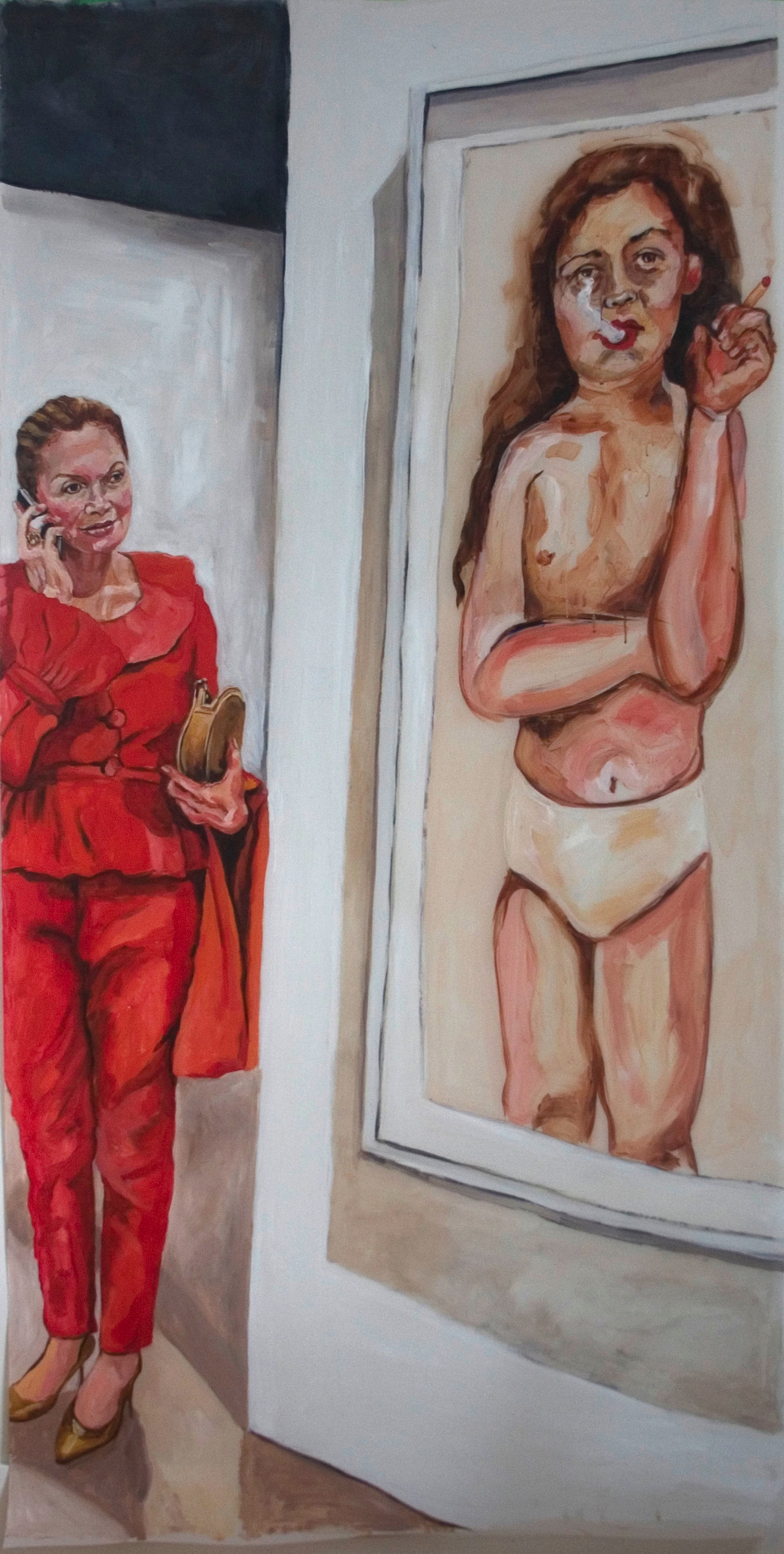
Her, 2014, acrylic on mylar, 72 x 42 inches (Series: Dear Art World)

Freeman's artwork, mainly figurative, depicts subjects from her own life and beyond with both immediacy and her signature painterly surfaces. Freeman draws inspiration from the work of artists such as Diego Velazquez, Édouard Manet, and John Singer Sargent, as well as contemporary artists Alice Neel, Lucian Freud, Elizabeth Peyton, and Henry Taylor.

Freeman works from both life and photography, generally using painting, drawing, or printmaking, to depict a diverse range of subjects, from celebrities and historical figures to family, friends, and strangers. Her style features gestural brushwork, strong drawing foundations, and intimacy, whether in modest or larger-scale compositions. She also engages with still life and landscape traditions.

In recent years, Freeman’s practice expanded into documentary and historical themes through the Canadian Forces Artist Program (CFAP), a Department of National Defence initiative deploying civilian artists to document Canadian Armed Forces activities. Selected as an alternate for Group 11 in 2024, she was activated in May 2025 for a three-day deployment to Ottawa, to record the Royal Visit of King Charles III and Queen Camilla—the King's first since his coronation, and a rare Speech from the Throne opening Parliament amid discussions of U.S. challenges to Canadian sovereignty. With privileged access to events (airport arrival, Rideau Hall tree-planting, Senate procession, 21-gun salute, National War Memorial wreath-laying) and rehearsals involving the 3rd Battalion Royal Canadian Regiment, RCAF Bands, Royal Canadian Dragoons, and RCMP Musical Ride—supported by military logistics and public affairs collaboration—she recorded photographic documentation and observations. The resulting body of work, spanning intimate to monumental scales, is slated for her institutional debut exhibition in Fall 2027, as arranged by CFAP (following the tradition of group exhibitions at venues like the Canadian War Museum).

== Exhibitions ==
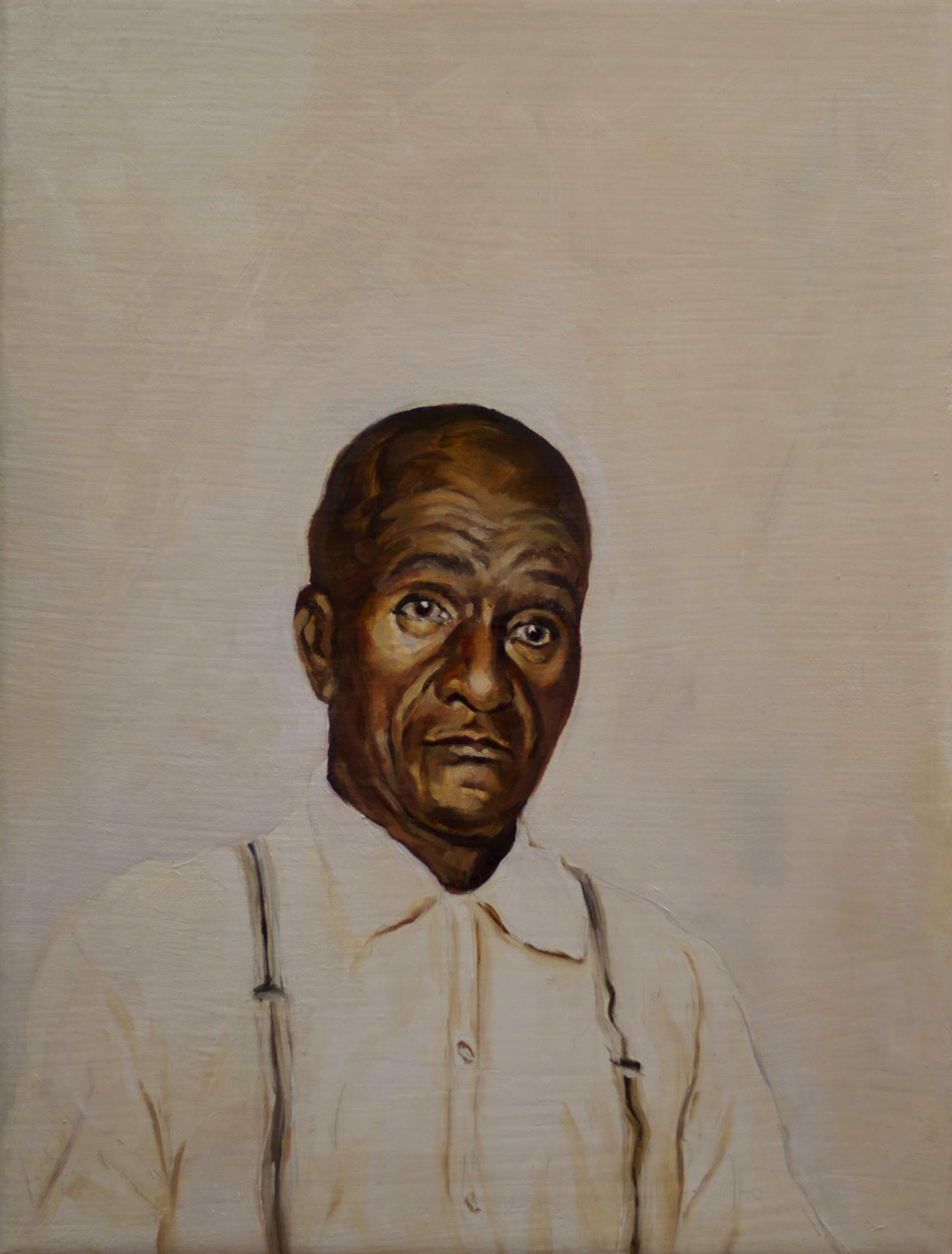
Mose Wright(Uncle of the late Emmett Till) by Carole Freeman

Freeman began exhibiting internationally in the late 1970s, with group shows including the 1979 British Petroleum Invitational and the 1980 Royal College of Art Graduate Exhibition in London, UK. Upon returning to Canada, she participated in institutional exhibitions such as the 1985 Fourth Faculty of Fine Arts Biennale at Concordia University, Montreal, Canada.

In the 2010s, her practice gained attention through solo exhibitions engaging contemporary themes. If the Paparazzi Could Paint (2010), explored celebrity culture. Friend Me: Portraits from Facebook (2011–2012, featured approximately 200 paintings based on digital profile images, using social media as both source and dissemination tool. This was followed by Selections 2012–2016 (2016), and Something About Winnipeg (2016). Her first New York solo exhibition, Unsung (2018), presented portraits of 24 unsung American heroes and was reviewed in New York Magazine as "beautiful meditations in paint on great women and men...rendered lovingly and intensely; the works impart that the chariot to greatness comes in many forms and that every artist is also one of these mighty figures, laboring with passion in private shadows."

Freeman has participated in group exhibitions and art fairs, including Roar (2023), with artists like Jennifer Bartlett, Cecily Brown, and Helen Frankenthaler, Young Masters (2017), and Classical Values: Modern and Contemporary Drawing (2014) with artists like David Hockney, Gustave Klimt, and Picasso, as well as Art Toronto (2014–2015) and Art New York (2017–2018).

=== Solo exhibitions ===
- Hang Mike Pence (window installation), Jim Kempner Fine Art, New York, NY, 2022
- Unsung, Jim Kempner Fine Art, New York, NY, 2018
- Something About Winnipeg, Gurevich Fine Art, Winnipeg, Canada, 2016
- Selections 2012-2016, Walnut Contemporary, Toronto, Canada, 2016
- Portraits From Facebook, Edward Day Gallery, Toronto, Canada, 2011
- Doing the Docs, Toronto International Film Festival Headquarters Hyatt Regency Hotel, Toronto, Canada, 2011
- If the Paparazzi Could Paint, International Film Festival Official Headquarters Hyatt Regency Hotel, Toronto, Canada, 2010
- If the Paparazzi Could Paint, Rebecca Gallery, Toronto, Canada, 2010

=== Group Exhibitions and Art Fairs ===
- Satellite Art Fair, Brenda Taylor Gallery, Miami, Fl, 2025
- A Delicate Balance, Jim Kempner Fine Art, New York, 2025
- Heads, Shoulders, Knees, & Toes: 20th & 21st Century Faces & Figures, Jim Kempner Fine Art, New York, NY, 2024
- Roar (Jennifer Bartlett, Louis Bourgeois, Cecily Brown, Helen Frankenthaler, Carole Freeman, Deborah Kass, Barbara Kruger, Elizabeth Murray, Yoko Ono, Kiki Smith, Lisa Yuskavage), Jim Kempner Fine Art, New York, NY, 2023
- Twenty-Fifth Anniversary Exhibition, Jim Kempner Fine Art, New York, NY, 2022
- 12 Chairs, Jim Kempner Fine Art, New York, NY, 2019
- Satellite Art Show, Curatious, Miami, FL, 2018
- Boston International Fine Art Show, Brenda Taylor Gallery, Boston, MA, 2018
- Art New York, Cynthia Corbett Gallery, New York, NY, 2018
- Young Masters, Cynthia Corbett Gallery, London, UK, 2017
- Art +, Van Der Plas Gallery, New York, NY, 2017
- ArtToronto, Gurevich Fine Art, Toronto, Canada, 2015
- ArtToronto, Gurevich Fine Art, Toronto, Canada, 2014
- Classical Values: Modern and Contemporary Drawing, Leslie Sacks Fine Art, Los Angeles, CA, 2014
- Women's Art, Gurevich Fine Art, Winnipeg, Canada, 2014
- Women's Art Now, Leslie Sacks Fine Art, Los Angeles, CA, 2013
- Art Takes Times Square, New York, NY, 2012

== Commissions ==
Notable commissions include a portrait for The Glass House in New Canaan, CT, three paintings for Jerry Saltz (Senior Art Critic, New York Magazine) and Roberta Smith (Senior Art Critic, NY Times), New York, NY, art dealer Jim Kempner, New York, NY, Guy Barron, Barron Collection, Bloomfield Hills, MI, the final portrait of Los Angeles art dealer Leslie Sacks for African Art from the Leslie Sacks Collection published by Skira, documentary filmmaker Morgan Spurlock, New York, NY, Lord and Lady Glentorran, Dublin, Ireland, portraits of Norman Jewison and David Mirvish for Harold Green Theatre Company, Toronto, Canada, Stefan Olsson (owner Stena Sphere), London, UK, and other international private collectors.

== Recognition ==
Freeman received awards during her studies which include the Royal College of Art Travel Award, and the University of Toronto Visual Art Award. She was granted two Canada Council Project Cost Grants and a four month residency at La Cite Internationale des Arts in Paris, France. Following her 2011 Toronto solo exhibition, Friend Me: Portraits of Facebook, Freeman was invited to the Canadian Arts Summit at the Banff Centre for Arts and Creativity as a guest panelist on the topic, Making Art in the Age of New Media, moderated by Janet Carding, Director of the Royal Ontario Museum. In 2018 she was invited by the Department of Visual Art, Brown University, Providence, RI, to conduct student critiques and deliver a talk about her work, specifically her New York solo exhibition Unsung. Freeman has produced commission work for Jerry Saltz, senior art critic for New York Magazine and Roberta Smith, co-chief art critic for The New York Times, Lord and Lady Glentorran, the Barron Collection, and Morgan Spurlock, filmmaker.

== Notable coverage and reviews ==
Freeman has received recognition through various international newspapers, magazines, and online publications. Most notable are: New York Magazine by Jerry Saltz, The Guardian, Wall Street International, Artnet News, Winnipeg Free Press, The Globe and Mail, The National Post, and Artoronto, as well as two major features in Arabella Magazine by Gary Michael Dault and MIA Magazine.

- University of Manitoba Today

Inspiring Minds: Perspective. Sean Moore, Fall, 2019

- The Brown Daily Herald

Visiting artist aims to show 'ray of hope'; in paintings. Jango McCormick, November 12, 2018

- New York Magazine

Carole Freeman: Unsung, The difference-makers. Jerry Saltz, April 15, 2018

- The Guardian

Unsung heroes: portraits of figures who deserve artistic recognition. Nadja Sayej, March 16, 2018

- Wall Street International

22 Apr 2018 at Jim Kempner Fine Art, New York. March 28, 2018

- Artnet News

Editor's Picks: 14 Things to See in New York This Week. Sarah Cascone, March 12, 2018

Editor's Picks: 14 Things to See in New York This Week. Sarah Cascone, April 16, 2018

- Winnipeg Free Press

Painting the Faces of Winnipeg. Alison Gilmore, October 31, 2016

- Artoronto

Carole Freeman's Selections 2012-2016 at Walnut Contemporary. David Saric, August, 2016

- Arabella

Surprise Appearances.Gary Michael Dault, Summer Issue, 2016

- Globe and Mail

Carole Freeman Finds Her Muse on Facebook, James Adams, December 2, 2011

Carole Freeman's Facebook Friends. December 2, 2011

== Permanent collections ==
=== Public collections ===
- University of Manitoba, Winnipeg, Canada
- Thompson Dorfman Sweatman LLP, Winnipeg, Canada
- Art Bank, Ottawa, Canada
- Continental Oil Company, London, UK
- Royal College of Art, London, UK
- York University, Toronto, Canada

=== Private collections ===
- Guy and Nora Barron Collection
- Jerry Saltz and Roberta Smith Collection
- Morgan Spurlock
- Leslie Sacks Estate
- Stefan Olsson (Stena Sphere)
- Brian Levitt (Chair, Montreal Museum of Fine Arts / TD Bank Financial Group)
- Lord and Lady Glentoran Collection
