= André M. Levesque =

Canadian historian and military officer

André M. Levesque OMM OOnt CD FRSA
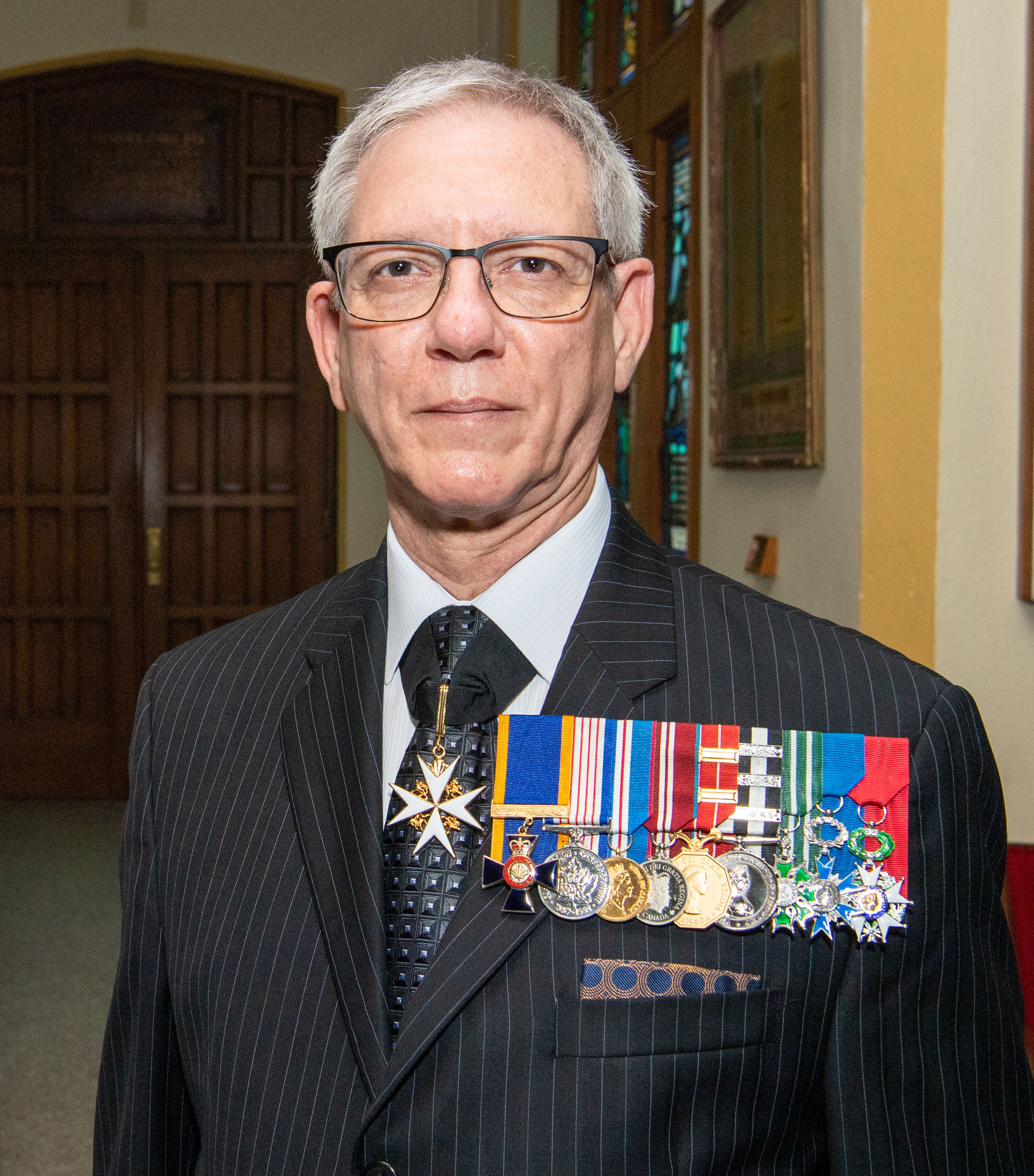
- Levesque at Currie Hall in 2024
- Education: University College Cork; Carleton University
- Military career
- Allegiance: Canadian Armed Forces
- Rank: Lieutenant-colonel
- Units: Governor General's Foot Guards, Cameron Highlanders of Ottawa
- Known for: Commemoration and memorialogy

André M. Levesque is a Canadian historian, former public servant and retired military officer known for his work in commemoration. He is delegate general of Le Souvenir français au Canada, and former chancellor of the Priory of Canada of the Order of Saint John.

== Early life and education ==
Levesque completed a bachelor's degree and master's degree in geography at Carleton University in Ottawa, and a PhD in history at University College Cork in 2013. His PhD thesis was entitled "Redefining military memorials and commemoration and how they have changed since the 19th century with a focus on Anglo-American practice".

== Career ==
Levesque was a member of the Canadian Armed Forces Army Reserves. He served in the Governor General's Foot Guards before transferring to the Cameron Highlanders of Ottawa. In 2008, he retired after 35 years at the rank of lieutenant-colonel. He became interested in commemoration after meeting veterans while in the service.

He was manager of Operation Memoria, which repatriated Canada's Unknown Soldier from Vimy, France to Ottawa, Ontario. He was volunteer chief historian at Beechwood Cemetery. In 2001, he set up the National Inventory of Canadian Military Memorials website. He was program manager of the Canadian Forces Artists Program. He worked in municipal urban planning and economic development in Ottawa from 1986 to 1998. In 2001, he joined the Public Service of Canada. In 2002, he became Chief of Canadian Forces Honours and Awards, and in 2006 he became Director of Honours and Recognition. He oversaw the awarding of over 200,000 medals. Levesque was secretary of the Advisory Committee and Advisory Council for the Order of Military Merit from 2002 to 2013. He chaired the Victoria Cross Production Planning Group.

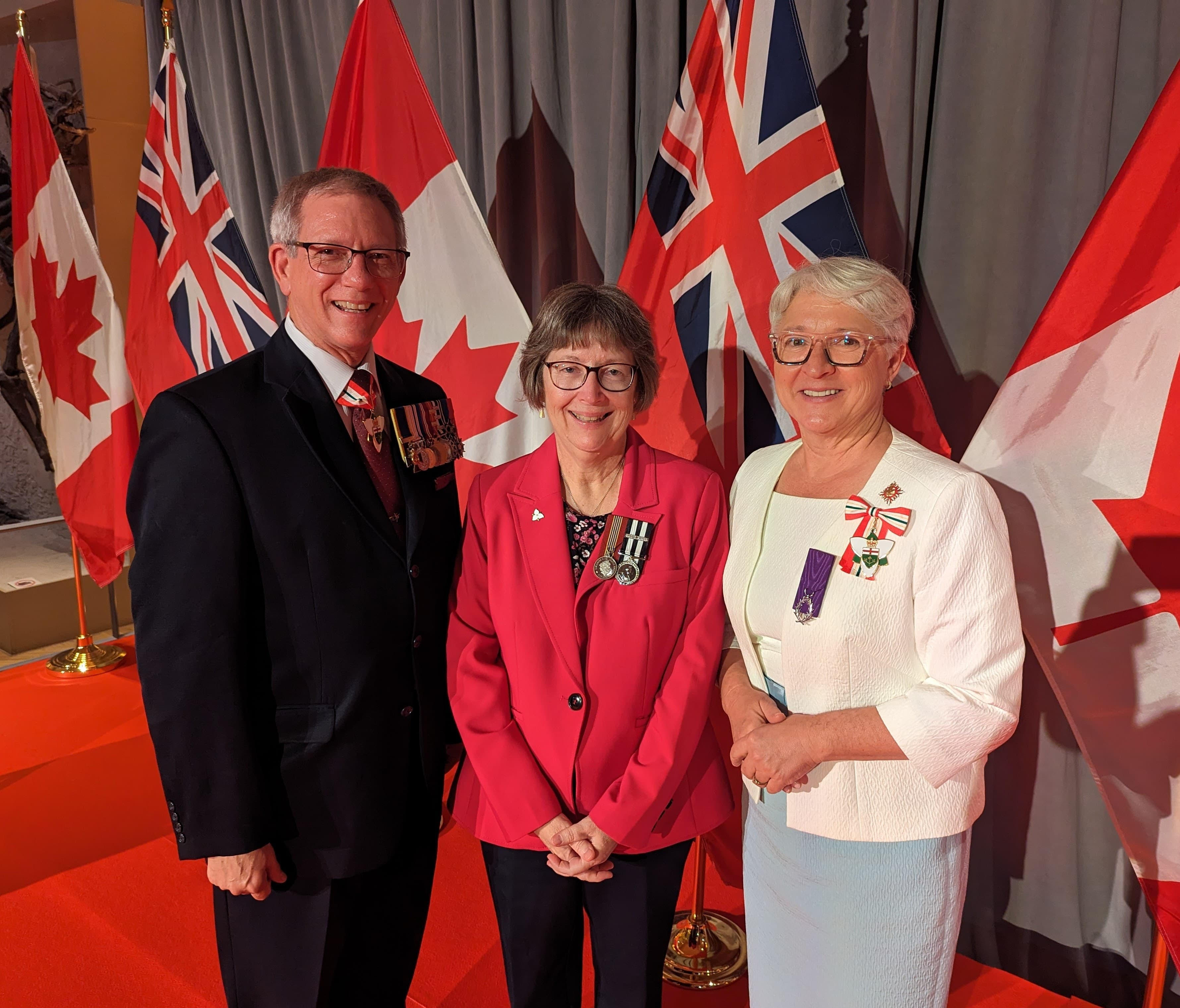
André M. Levesque (left), his wife Andrea (center), and Ontario Lieutenant Governor Edith Dumont (right) in 2024.

In 2019, he retired as visiting scholar at the Royal Military College of Canada. He chairs the International Society for Commemoration, Memorials, and other Monuments.

In 2020, Levesque became deputy chancellor of St. John Ambulance in Canada and of the Priory of Canada of the Order of Saint John. He became chancellor of the priory in 2022. During his military service, he was an instructor with the organization.

Levesque is president of the Canadian delegation of the Société Nationale d'Entraide de la Médaille militaire, and Monument Amicitia France-Canada, which commemorates the historical friendship between France and Canada. He is delegate general of Le Souvenir français au Canada. He was a research fellow of the Conference of Defence Associations Institute.

== Awards and honours ==
Levesque received the Order of Ontario in 2020 for his work in memorialogy. and the Order of Ottawa in 2023. In 2024, he was granted the Freedom of the City of London, and an honorary Doctor of Laws (LL.D) degree from the Royal Military College of Canada.

He has received the following orders and awards.

Orders and awards
Description	Notes
King Charles III Coronation Medal	2024 – Canadian version of this medal
Order of Ontario	2020
Knight of the National Order of the Legion of Honour (France)	2017
Order of Saint John	Knight of Justice 2014 Commander 2011 Member 2000
Queen Elizabeth II Diamond Jubilee Medal	2012 – Canadian version of this medal
Knight of the National Order of Merit (France)	2012
Officer of the Order of Military Merit (OMM)	2006
Knight of the Order of Arts and Letters (France)	2006
Queen Elizabeth II Golden Jubilee Medal	2002 – Canadian version of this medal

=== Arms ===
Coat of arms of André M. Levesque
Adopted March 21, 1996 Crest Rising out of a coronet erable Gules a demi lion guardant triple queued and mitred Or and holding between the forepaws an astrolabe Gules Escutcheon Gules a lion rampant guardant triple queued and mitred and holding between the forepaws and dexter hind paw a crozier Or Motto MEMORIA (trans. "Memory") has been Levesque's motto since 2023. Prior to this, it was SUCCESSUS A DILIGENTIA (trans. "Success comes from diligence"). Badge An astrolabe Gules perched thereon a parrot reguardant Or
