= Mats Wahlstrom =

Swedish entrepreneur and hotelier

Mats Wahlström
- Born: Stockholm, Sweden
- Other names: Mats Wahlstroem, Mats Wahlstrom
- Occupations: Entrepreneur, businessman
- Years active: 1990-present
- Known for: Puro Hotel, Purobeach

Mats Wahlström (also Wahlstroem or Wahlstrom) is a Swedish entrepreneur and hotelier. He is the founder of International hospitality group Puro, Purobeach and Purohotels. He is also the founder of lifestyle brand Spirit of the Nomad and music platform Melobee Music Revolution.

== Early life ==
Wahlstrom was born and raised in Stockholm, Sweden. He holds a Bachelor in Business Administration degree from Gothenburg School of Business, Economics and Law. After graduation, he worked in international sales at the headquarters of Itochu in Japan. From a young age, he had interest in entrepreneurship and travelling. At the age of 26, while living in Switzerland, he founded Mercantile Spareparts AG in Zug, providing steel rims, auto parts and accessories and sold it in 1996. In the late 1990s, he established Fastigheter AB, which bought office and department stores in and around Stockholm.

== Career ==
Wahlstrom the founder of the Puro Group, which includes, beach clubs, a record label, a plane and the hotel Puro Oasis Urbano. In 1998, he acquired an old city palace from 18th century during the economic crisis in Palma de Mallorca. In 2004, he opened the first Puro Hotel, after years of renovation with 26 rooms, bar and swimming pool facility. The hotel did brisk business and the connected Opio bar & restaurant received cult status in Europe.

In 2005, he opened Purobeach Club on a mini peninsula outside Palma, offering music themed pool atmosphere, Balinese sunbaths, and private Puro Spa with restaurant. Followed by its success, he expanded his Purobeach concept into mainland, opening Purobeach Marbella in 2006. Afterwards, Wahlström expanded its operation in Europe and Latin America, opening new branches in Vilamoura, Montenegro as well as the Black Sea resort of Mamaia in Romania. Having opened a private wing in 2011, the Puro Hotel currently comprises 51 rooms and suits, room deck Jacuzzis and private terraces. Purobeach Toscana started as a joint venture with Fernando Feragamo's Marina di Scarlino in 2013. In the year, Purobeach also partnered with Hilton Group and expanded its operation opening further beach clubs at the Conrad Dubai and Hilton Diagonal Mar Barcelona. Purobeach opened another beach club in Dubai at Jebel Ali Golf Resort.

In 2009, Wahlstrom launched Purobeach Music together with Seamless Recordings. He is also involved in magazines and book projects in Scandinavia and Europe.

In February 2014, Wahlstrom left Puro Group after selling his shares and to engage on new projects.

After long years of travel and experience as a lifestyle hotelier, Wahlstrom started a new lifestyle brand Spirit of the Nomad based in Switzerland, which manufactures linen and towels from organic Egyptian cotton.

In 2017, Wahlstrom co-founded Melobee Music Revolution AB, a digital music platform for promoting new artists and their music. In addition, he has development and other business projects taking place in South America, Africa and Europe.

== Personal life ==
Mats Wahlstrom lives in Verbier in Switzerland and has more residences in Palma, Stockholm and Costa Rica. His son Agaton Ted Jensen was born in 2000. Wahlstrom dated German actress Ursula Karven from 2009 to 2013 and briefly reunited a few months later and got engaged in July 2014. In February 2016, they got separated again citing "Unbreakable differences".
