= Madeleine Olsson Eriksson =

Swedish gynecologist, businesswoman, and philanthropist

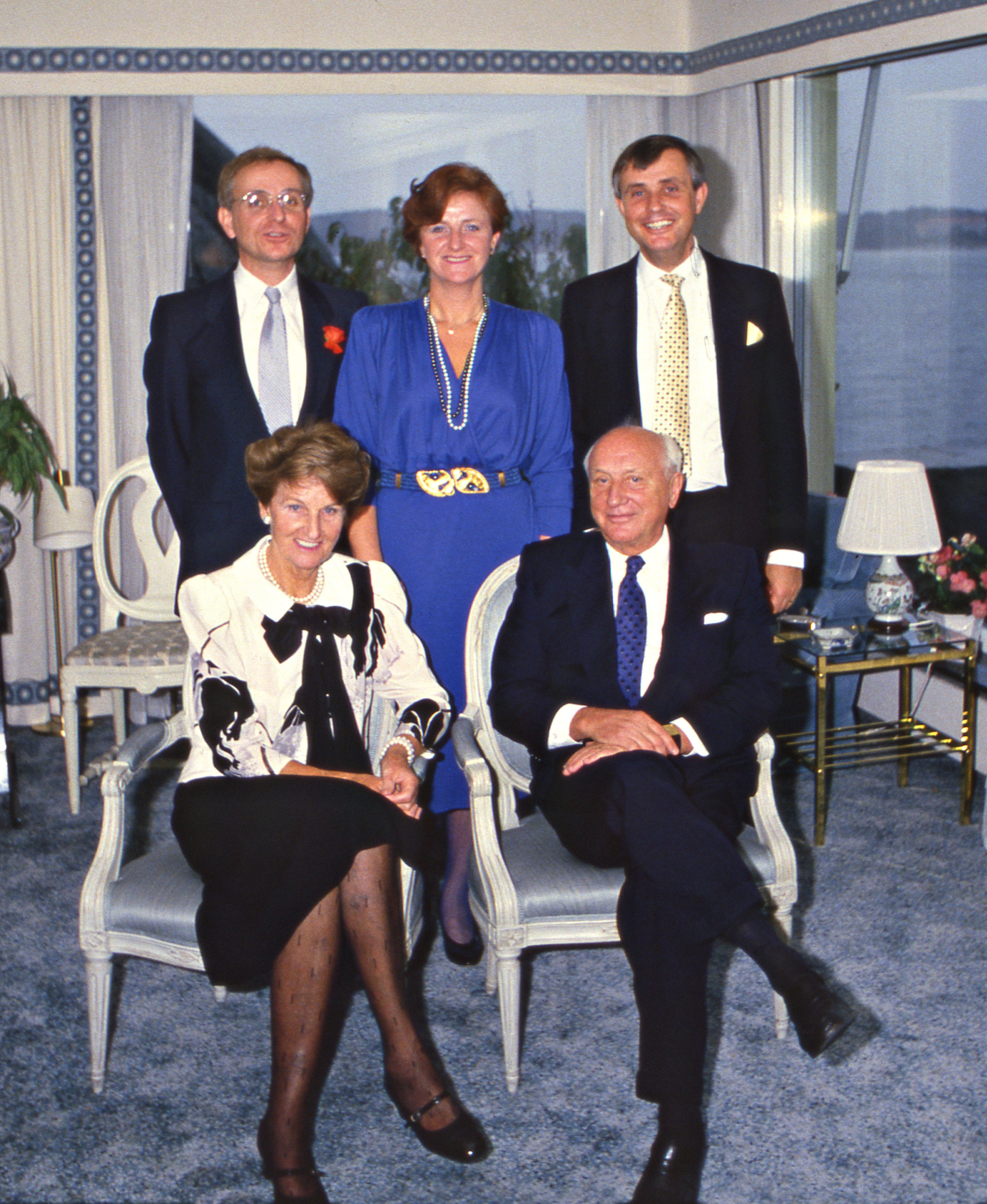
- Photograph of Madeleine Olsson Eriksson (2019)
- Born: 25 August 1945 (age 80); Gothenburg, Sweden
- Education: Karolinska Institute
- Occupations: Gynecologist; businesswoman; philanthropist
- Spouse: Bert-Åke Eriksson
- Children: 2
- Parent(s): Sten Allan Olsson; Birgit Andersson
- Relatives: Dan Olsson (brother); Stefan Olsson (brother)

Madeleine Olsson Eriksson (born 25 August 1945) is a Swedish gynecologist, businesswoman, and philanthropist.

== Biography ==
Olsson Eriksson was born in on 25 August 1945 in Gothenburg, the only daughter of Sten Allan Olsson, the founder of Stena Sphere. Her brothers are Dan, Stefan and Christofer.

Olsson Eriksson grew up as the oldest child in the Olsson shipping family. After graduating from the Latin line, she began academic studies in Lund, where she received a bachelor's degree. She then changed careers, studied medicine at Karolinska Institute in Stockholm and received her medical ID in 1981. She has since worked in Gotland, among other places. Since the 1990s, she has been active at Avenykliniken in central Gothenburg, which she owns together with two partners.

In 1996, Olsson Eriksson became chairman of Sten A Olsson's Foundation for Research and Culture. The foundation, which was founded in connection with her father's 80th birthday, annually supports various cultural personalities, institutions and research projects in western Sweden. For this commitment, she was appointed an honorary doctor in 2007 by the Faculty of Arts at the University of Gothenburg.

Olsson Eriksson was ranked 22nd among Sweden's billionaires in 2012 and was the fifth richest woman.

== Personal life ==
Since 1982, Olsson Eriksson has been married to company manager Bert-Åke Eriksson who is active in Stena Sphere. The couple have two children Gustav (born 1983) and Marie (born 1985).
