= Jerry Saltz =

American art critic and historian (born 1951)

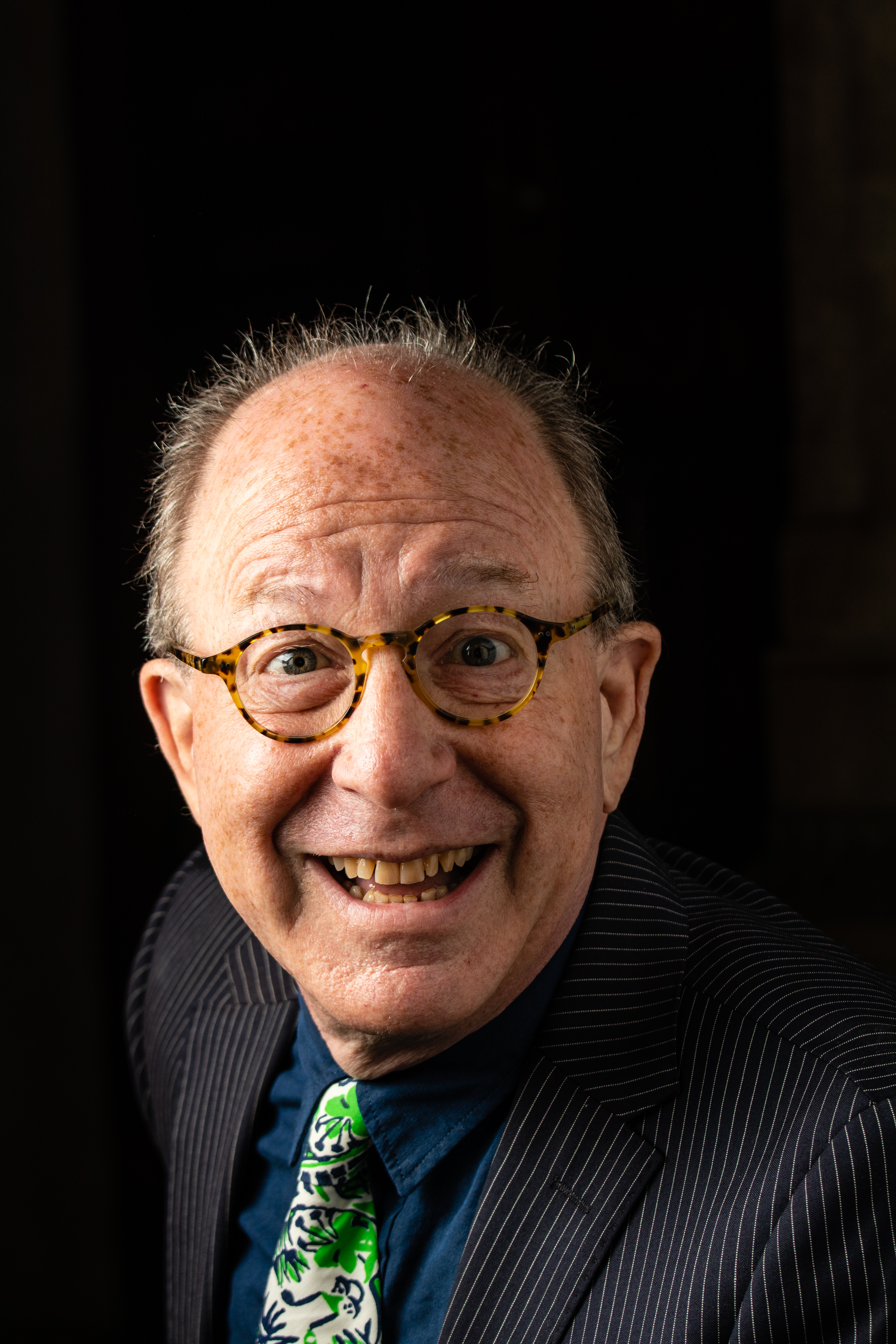
- Saltz at the 2018 Pulitzer Prizes
- Born: February 19, 1951 (age 75); Oak Park, Illinois, U.S.
- Education: School of the Art Institute of Chicago
- Occupations: Journalist, Author, Art critic
- Spouse: Roberta Smith (m. 1992)
- Writing career
- Period: 1990s–present
- Notable works: Seeing Out Loud: The Village Voice Art Columns, 1998–2003; Seeing Out Louder
- Notable awards: Pulitzer Prize for Criticism (2018)

Jerry Saltz (born February 19, 1951) is an American art critic. Since 2006, he has been senior art critic and columnist for New York magazine. Formerly the senior art critic for The Village Voice, he received the Pulitzer Prize for Criticism in 2018 and was nominated for the award in 2001 and 2006. Saltz served as a visiting critic at School of Visual Arts, Columbia University, Yale University, and The School of the Art Institute of Chicago and the New York Studio Residency Program, and was the sole advisor for the 1995 Whitney Biennial.

Saltz is the recipient of three honorary doctorates, including from the School of the Art Institute of Chicago in 2008 and Kansas City Art Institute in 2011.

== Early life and education ==
Saltz was born in Oak Park, before moving to River Forest, Illinois. His mother died when he was ten years old. Shortly after he recalls a memorable trip to the Art Institute of Chicago, where he discovered, "Everything here is telling a story, everything here has a code, has a language—and I’m going to learn this whole language and I’m going to know the story."

Saltz moved to the inner city and attended the School of the Art Institute of Chicago from 1970 to 1975 before dropping out.

== Career ==
Saltz worked briefly at Jan Cicero Gallery before co-founding, with Barry Holden and artists from the Art Institute of Chicago, N.A.M.E. Gallery, an artist-run gallery. Saltz moved to New York City in 1980.

=== Art criticism ===
Since 2006, Saltz has been senior art critic and columnist for New York magazine. Formerly the senior art critic for The Village Voice, he has also contributed to Art in America, Flash Art International, Frieze, and Modern Painters, Vulture.com among other art publications.

In an article in Artnet magazine, Saltz codified his outlook: "All great contemporary artists, schooled or not, are essentially self-taught and are de-skilling like crazy. I don't look for skill in art...Skill has nothing to do with technical proficiency... I'm interested in people who rethink skill, who redefine or reimagine it: an engineer, say, who builds rockets from rocks." In 2008 Saltz said, "I'm looking for what the artist is trying to say and what he or she is actually saying, what the work reveals about society and the timeless conditions of being alive".

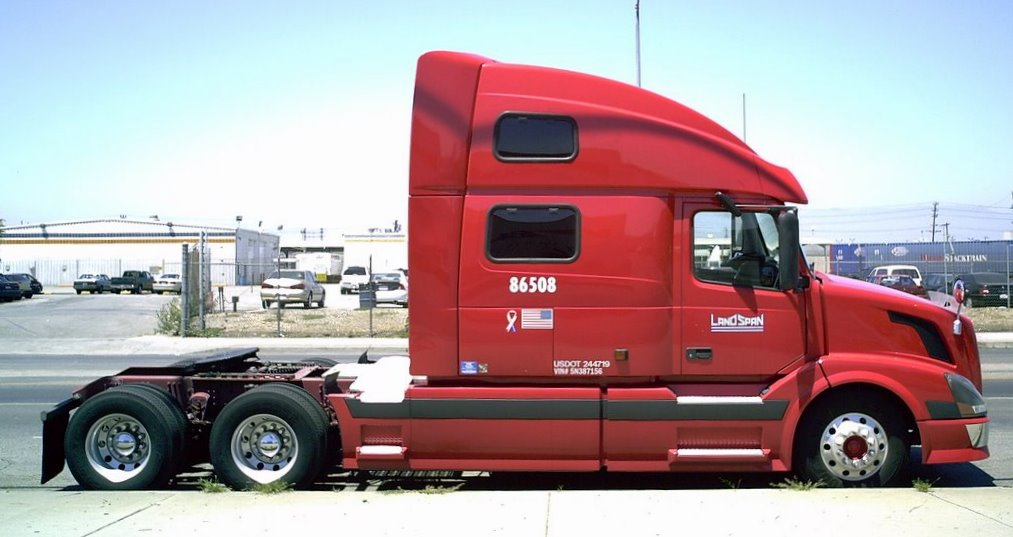
Saltz was a long distance truck driver until the age of 41, before becoming an art critic.

In Seeing Out Loud, his collection of Village Voice columns published in 2003, he said he considers himself the kind of critic that Peter Plagens calls a "goalie," someone who says "It's going to have to be pretty good to get by me."

Saltz has cited Manny Farber's "termite art" and Joan Didion's "Babylon" as well as other wide-ranging systemic metaphors for the art world. Although he's defended the art market, he's also called out faddy market behavior and the fetish for youth, saying "the art world eats its young."

On a College Art Association panel in February 2007, Saltz commented, "We live in a Wikipedia art world. Twenty years ago, there were only four to five encyclopedias—and I tried to get into them. Now, all writing is in the Wikipedia. Some entries are bogus, some are the best. We live in an open art world."

His humor, irreverence, self-deprecation and volubility have led some to call him the Rodney Dangerfield of the art world. He has expressed doubt about art critics' influence as purveyors of taste, saying they have little effect on the success of an artist's career. Nonetheless, ArtReview called him the 73rd most powerful person in the art world in their 2009 Power 100 list.

In 2007, he received the Frank Jewett Mather Award for art criticism from the College Art Association.

In a 2018 interview, Saltz maintained, "To this day I wake up early and I have to get to my desk to write almost immediately. I mean fast. Before the demons get me. I got to get writing. And once I’ve written almost anything, I’ll pretty much write all day, I don’t leave my desk, I have no other life. I’m not part of the world except when I go to see shows."

That same year, Saltz reviewed American-Canadian artist Carole Freeman's exhibit featuring portraits of little known Americans who bring to light current socio-political issues. Saltz wrote: "These transporting portraits are beautiful meditations in paint... Each is rendered lovingly and intensely; the works impart that the chariot to greatness comes in many forms and that every artist is also one of these mighty figures, laboring with passion in private shadows."

=== Dialogue with readers through Facebook ===
Saltz uses Facebook more actively than many other art critics, posting daily questions and diatribes to his audience of friends, which numbered 94,039 people in December 2020. He has stated that he wants to demystify the art critic to artists and a general art audience. His posts are less polished and restrained than his writing for New York Magazine and vulture.com, and he has shared personal matters including family tragedies, career bumps and his diet. He told the New York Observer, "It's exciting to be in this room with 5,000 people. It's like the Cedar Bar for me, or Max's Kansas City."

He has used his page to defend the use of irony in art, arguing against adherents of "the New Seriousness", whom he calls the "Purity Police".

Some Facebook-related Jerry Saltz activity

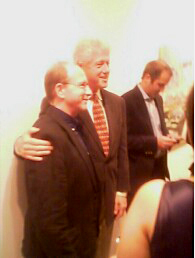
Saltz and Bill Clinton pose at an art gallery exhibit opening—side view of the scene long used as the user-avatar on Saltz's official Facebook page

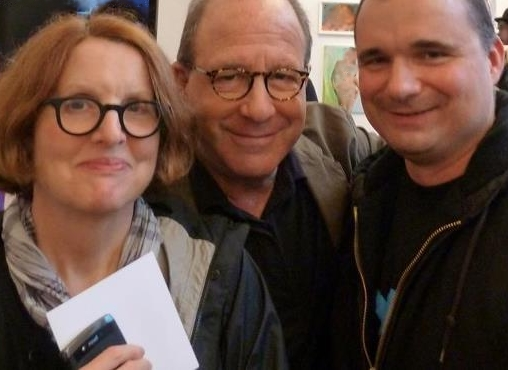
At the public opening reception of an art exhibit at a gallery in New York City, Saltz (center) is flanked by wife Roberta Smith and artist and Facebook friend Terry Ward.

In 2010, artist Jennifer Dalton exhibited an artwork called "What Are We Not Shutting Up About?" at the FLAG Foundation in New York that statistically analyzed five months of Facebook conversations between Saltz and his online friends. In an interview with Artinfo, Dalton said of the work, “I became interested in Jerry Saltz's Facebook page as an amazing site of written dialogue and as a place where culture is being created on the spot. I think my piece, and Jerry Saltz's Facebook page itself, tells us that a lot of people in the art world crave dialogue and community, and when a space is welcoming enough people really flock to it.”

In 2010, Saltz asked his Facebook friends about art studio (or office) door signs—and then later sought someone to compile the replies. The result was a book featuring Saltz and dozens of his page's followers' quotes: JERRY SALTZ ART CRITIC's Fans, Friends, & The Tribes Suggested ART STUDIO DOOR SIGNS of Real Life or Fantasy.

In 2015, Saltz was briefly suspended from Facebook after the site received complaints from users about provocative posts.

=== Art critic as television personality ===
Saltz served as a judge in the Bravo television series Work of Art: The Next Great Artist which ran from June 9, 2010, to December 21, 2011.

=== Publications ===
- Saltz, Jerry. Seeing Out Loud: The Village Voice Art Columns, 1998–2003. Gt Barrington: The Figures, 2003; reprinted 2007; 410 pp. (paperback), ISBN 978-1-930589-17-9.
- Saltz, Jerry. Seeing Out Louder. Hudson Hills Press LLC, 2009; 420 pp. (hardcover), ISBN 978-1-55595-318-8.
- Saltz, Jerry. Beyond Boundaries: New York's New Art. 1986; 128 pp. ISBN 978-0-912383-31-6
- Saltz, Jerry. How to Be an Artist. 2020; 144 pp. ISBN 9780593086469
- Saltz, Jerry. Art is Life: Icons and Iconoclasts, Visionaries and Vigilantes, and Flashes of Hope in the Night. Penguin Random House, 2022; 354 pp. ISBN 978-0593086490

=== Awards ===
Saltz received the Pulitzer Prize for Criticism in 2018 and was a finalist for the award in 2001 and 2006.

Saltz is the recipient of three honorary doctorates, including from the School of the Art Institute of Chicago in 2008 and Kansas City Art Institute in 2011.

== Personal life ==
Saltz lives in New York City with his wife Roberta Smith, co-chief art critic for the New York Times. They were married in 1992. Saltz is Jewish.
