= Printify =

Latvian print on demand company

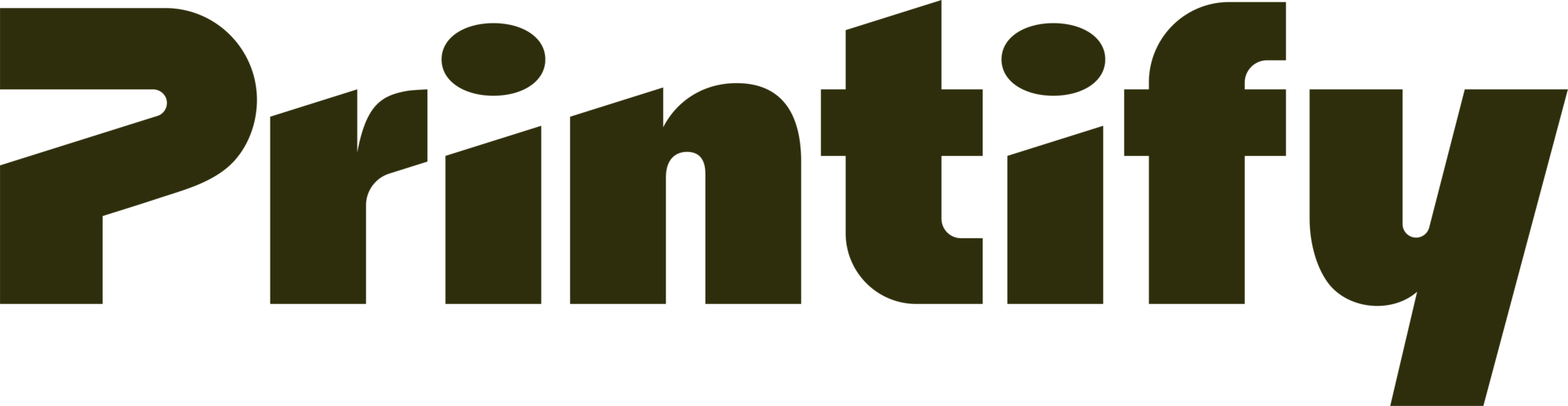
- Type: Private
- Founded: 2015
- Founders: Artis Kehris; Gatis Dukurs; James Berdigans
- Headquarters: Riga, Latvia
- Key people: Alex Saltonstall (CEO); Anastasija Oleinika (President and Head of Platform)
- Website: printify.com

Printify is a Latvian print-on-demand technology company based in Riga.

Following a 2024 merger with Printful, Printify became part of one of the largest print-on-demand groups globally.

== History ==
Printify was founded in 2015 in Riga by Artis Kehris, Gatis Dukurs, and Jānis James Berdigans. Later, it established its headquarters in San Francisco, California.

In 2018, Printify raised $1 million in investment to accelerate its U.S. expansion. In 2019, it secured an additional $3 million in funding.

In November 2020, Printify relocated its headquarters to the Spīķeri district in Riga. The same year, it was included in the Financial Times ranking of Europe's fastest-growing companies.

In October 2021, Printify raised $45 million in Series A funding, including investment from H&M Group, to expand its technology platform, grow its global print provider network, and strengthen integrations with major e-commerce platforms.

In November 2024, Printify announced a merger with Printful, another Latvia-founded print-on-demand company.
