= Sten Allan Olsson =

Swedish businessman

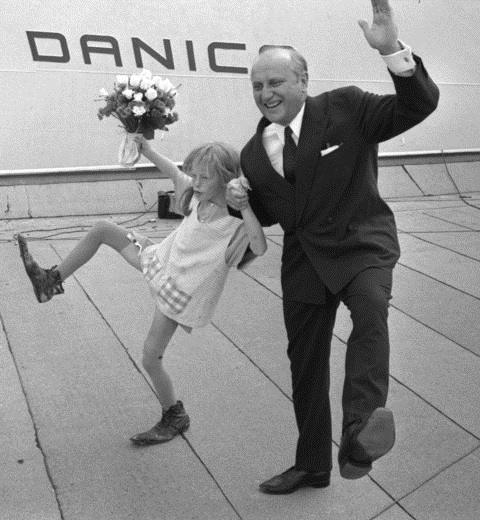
- Olsson and Inger Nilsson (as Pippi Longstocking) on board MS Stena Danica II, 1969
- Born: 28 October 1916; Donsö, Gothenburg archipelago, Sweden
- Died: 12 July 2013 (aged 96)
- Occupation: Businessman
- Spouse: Birgit Andersson
- Children: Dan Olsson; Stefan Olsson; Madeleine Olsson Eriksson

Sten Allan Olsson (28 October 1916 – 12 July 2013) was a Swedish billionaire businessman, the founder, CEO and owner of Stena Sphere.

Sten Allan Olsson was born on 28 October 1916, on Donsö, in the Gothenburg archipelago, the son of a schooner owner and captain. He was educated at Ljungskile Folk High School, followed by a commercial college in Gothenburg.

Olsson started a Gothenburg metals and rubber trading company in 1939, at the start of the Second World War, and moved into freight shipping. He founded the ferry company Stena Line in 1962, initially on the Gothenburg-Skagen route.

He married Birgit Andersson in 1944, and they had three children. He died on 12 July 2013.
