= Elanders =

Swedish printing company

- Company type: Aktiebolag (AB)
- Industry: Printing
- Founded: 1908
- Headquarters: Mölnlycke, Sweden
- Key people: Carl Bennet, Chairman; Magnus Nilsson, CEO
- Revenue: 220 Mio. EUR
- Number of employees: 1863
- Website: www.elanders.com

Elanders is a Swedish printing company doing business in ten countries and directing a number of subsidiaries. Since 1989 the company has been listed on the OMX Nordic Exchange.

== History ==
Elanders was created from a print office founded in 1908 by Otto Elander, Nils Hellner and Emil Ekström in Sweden.

In January 2007 Elanders acquired the Sommer Corporate Media in Waiblingen, Germany. 5 years later, in March 2012 the acquisition of the fotokasten and the d|o|m Deutsche Online Medien GmbH in Waiblingen followed.

Elanders continued its strategic enterprise development in the area of photo finishing by acquiring the Berlin-based photobook manufacturer myphotobook GmbH with business operations throughout Europe in 2013.

== See also ==
- Finidr
- Printuful, Inc
