= Maquet =

German surgical equipment company

MAQUET GmbH
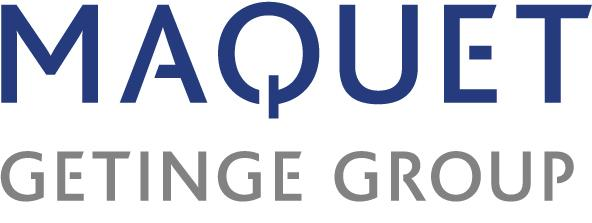
- Company type: Subsidiary
- Founded: 1838; 188 years ago
- Founder: Johann Friedrich Fischer
- Headquarters: Rastatt, Germany
- Products: Surgical workplaces; Critical care and cardiovascular
- Revenue: 1.172 billion EUR (2010)
- Number of employees: approx. 5,000
- Parent: Getinge Group
- Website: maquet.com

Maquet GmbH (self-styled as MAQUET) is a multinational German medical technology manufacturing company based in Rastatt with focus on equipment for surgical workplaces, anesthesia systems, workstations for intensive care and cardiovascular devices. MAQUET does business in three primary divisions - Surgical Workplaces, Critical Care and Cardiovascular. Maquet is one of the three primary business units of Swedish parent Getinge Group AB.

== History ==
The foundation for MAQUET was laid in 1838 by Johann Friedrich Fischer in Heidelberg. The company manufactured and sold patient chairs and other health care equipment. In 1876 it was a takeover of the company by Curt Maquet. In 1933 the company relocated to Rastatt, Germany.

In 2000 MAQUET was acquired by Getinge Group, leading to the foundation of the business area Medical Systems within the Getinge group. By the beginning of 2008, MAQUET has started into a phase of development into a therapeutic medical company, providing products and services to the OR (Operating Room), ER (Emergency Room), ICU (Intensive Care Unit), NICU (Neonatal Intensive Care Unit) of acute care hospitals on a global basis.

In 2008 MAQUET acquired US-based Datascope Corporation, which was ranked among the top three global leaders of intra-aortic balloon (IAB) counterpulsation technology. Datascope is a diversified cardiovascular device company that develops, manufactures and markets proprietary products for clinical health care markets in interventional cardiology, cardiovascular and vascular surgery, and critical care. Their products were sold globally through direct sales representatives and independent distributors. Founded in 1964, Datascope is headquartered in Montvale, New Jersey, and maintains a state-of-the-art R&D facility in Mahwah, New Jersey.

On March 12, 2008, Chinese medical device manufacturer Mindray announced that they reached agreement with Datascope to acquire Datascope's patient monitoring business (PMB). The acquisition launched Mindray into the ranks of leading international medical device vendors and created the then third-largest player in the global patient monitoring device industry.

Mindray paid Datascope $202 million cash in the transaction. Datascope retained approximately $38 million of receivables generated by the patient monitoring business for a total of $250 million. The Datascope PMB generated $161.3 million in sales in 2007. Mindray expected around $30 million of run-rate synergies in manufacturing, SG&A and R&D within 3 years. Mindray retains rights to the Datascope brand until 2015; however, MAQUET, owing to its primary ownership position and acquisition role pertaining to Datascope's other products and services has been conceded, in a special arrangement, to Mindray. Accordingly, all web traffic re-direction rights, content and links to former Datascope products and services, now owned by MAQUET auto-redirect to its homepage, specifically for support of all devices not now owned by Mindray.

In 2016 Getinge AB unified all former brands under the Getinge name, generating a new master brand identity, Maquet was included within the rebrand as a product family name.

== Products ==
=== Patents ===
The company has filed over 420 patent applications since 2006.

== Production Facilities ==
In addition to the Rasatt site, where both Maquet GmbH and its subsidiaries; Maquet Cardiopulmonary, Getinge Hospital Solutions and MediKomp are located, Maquet has sites in Hechingen, and Feldkirchen.

Additionally, the company has production facilities located in:

- France
  - Ardon: Maquet SAS
  - La Ciotat: Intervascular SAS
- Sweden
  - Solna: Maquet Critical Care
- Turkey
  - Antalya: MAQUET Cardiopulmonary Medikal Teknik San.Tic.Ltd.Şti.
- South Africa
  - Woodmead - Johannesburg: Maquet Southern Africa (Pty) Ltd
- China
  - Suzhou: Maquet (Suzhou) Co., Ltd
- United States
  - Hudson, New Hampshire: Atrium Medical Corporation
  - Wayne, New Jersey: Maquet Cardiovascular, LLC
- Puerto Rico
  - Dorado (entity closed in 2014 transfer of production to Wayne USA 2008)

== Corporate Structure ==
Maquet GmbH and its subsidiaries are part of the Getinge Group, via associated companies. The overall parent company is Getinge AB in Gothenburg, Sweden.

The wholly owned subsidiaries of Maquet GmbH include Maquet Cardiopulmonary GmbH in Rastatt, MediKomp GmbH in Rastatt (which manufactures individual components, assemblies, and machines for medical devices, primarily for Maquet Cardiopulmonary GmbH), Getinge Hospital Solutions GmbH in Rastatt, and Maquet Belgium N.V. in Groot-Bijgaarden, Groot-Bijgaarden. Maquet also has an indirect ownership in Maquet Spain S.L.U. through its subsidiary Maquet Cardiopulmonary.

== Partnerships ==
- Menlo Worldwide (2004) for supply chain logistics
