= Getinge Group =

Medical technology company

Getinge
- Type: Publicly traded Aktiebolag
- Traded as: Nasdaq Stockholm: GETI B
- ISIN: SE0000202624
- Industry: Health care
- Founded: 1904; 122 years ago
- Headquarters: Gothenburg, Sweden
- Key people: Johan Malmquist (Chairman), Mattias Perjos (President and CEO)
- Products: Disinfectors, sterilisation equipment, surgical tables, ventilators, heart-lung machines, anesthesia, bioreactors, hospital digital integration solutions
- Revenue: SEK 34.7 billion (2024)
- Operating income: SEK 2,854 million(2024)
- Net income: SEK 1,654 million (2024)
- Total assets: SEK 63,918 million (end 2024)
- Total equity: SEK 33,210 million (end 2024)
- Number of employees: ~12,000 (end 2024)
- Subsidiaries: Maquet
- Website: getinge.com

Getinge AB is a publicly traded Swedish medical technology company. The company produces and distributes medical products and equipment for the healthcare and life sciences industries. The company is divided into three business areas: Life Science, Acute Care Therapies, and Surgical Workflows. The group employs approximately 12,000 people worldwide. The CEO of the company is Mattias Perjos, and the chairman of the board is Johan Malmquist. With a sales share of around 40%, the United States is by far the most important market for the company due to significantly higher prices and margins there. China and various Western European countries follow.

== Operations ==
Getinge operates through three business areas: Life Sciences, Acute Care Therapies, and Surgical Workflows. Getinge's Acute Care Therapies business provides products for intensive care, cardiovascular procedures, and other acute-care applications, while Surgical Workflows supplies equipment and systems used in operating rooms and sterile processing departments. The Life Science business provides equipment and services for pharmaceutical production, biomedical research and other life science applications. The company employs approximately 12,000 people worldwide. The United States is Getinge's largest market, accounting for approximately 40% of sales. The company also has significant operations in China and Western Europe.

== History ==
Getinge was founded in 1904 in Sweden as an agricultural company by Olander Larsson (1864–1927) in the small town of Getinge and expanded into the medical technology sector in the 1930s. The company was acquired by Electrolux in 1964 and strengthened through a series of acquisitions. In 1989, it was acquired by Rune Andersson and Carl Bennet, two former Electrolux managers. They took the company public in 1993 for 600 million SEK, where it is listed on the Stockholm Stock Exchange and has been part of the OMXS30 index from July 2009 to June 2025. With a 20% stake in the capital and 50.19% of the voting rights, Carl Bennet remains the main owner of the company through his holding company Carl Bennet AB. Other notable owners include two Swedish pension funds and American asset managers such as Vanguard and Blackrock. The same Carl Bennet also controls Lifco AB, which from 1995 to 1998 was a division of Getinge, but since 2014 is listed separately on the Stockholm Stock Exchange.

Getinge has acquired a large number of smaller and larger companies over the decades. In 2000 it acquired the German Maquet GmbH. Further acquisitions followed, such as the purchase of Heraeus Med in 2002 and Huntleigh Technology PLC in 2007. In 2011, Getinge acquired the US company Atrium Medical, and in 2014, it acquired the German company Pulsion Medical Systems. The most recent major acquisitions on the US market were Healthmark Industries in 2023 and Paragonix Technologies in 2024.

In 2025, Getinge expanded its Servo-c ventilator offerings to neonatal patients; the new design can support preterm birth babies weighing as little as 500 grams.

== Product recalls and Lawsuits ==
Over the years, the company has faced legal allegations and product recalls. For example, the US FDA alone ordered the recall of two Getinge products in 2023 due to significant risks. Additionally, the company agreed to pay around 200 million SEK in the US to settle a class-action lawsuit over defects in surgical products. For a further 360 million SEK, the company agreed to settle with Brazilian authorities after allegations of unfair competition between 2004 and 2017.
