= Dan Olsson =

Swedish businessman

- Born: February 1947 (age 79)
- Education: Gothenburg School of Business, Economics and Law
- Occupation: Businessman
- Spouse: married
- Parent(s): Sten Allan Olsson; Birgit Andersson
- Relatives: Stefan Olsson (brother); Madeleine Olsson Eriksson (sister)

Dan Sten Olsson (born February 1947) is a Swedish billionaire businessman, the CEO and majority owner (51%) of Stena Sphere.

Dan Sten Olsson was born in February 1947, the son of Sten Allan Olsson, the founder of Stena Sphere. His siblings Stefan Olsson owns 24.5% and Madeleine Olsson Eriksson owns 12.5%, her two children 6% each.

Olsson has a degree from the Gothenburg School of Business, Economics and Law.

Olsson owns 51% of Stena Sphere, and has been CEO since 1983.

He is married and lives in Gothenburg, Sweden.
