= Carl Bennet =

Swedish businessman (born 1951)

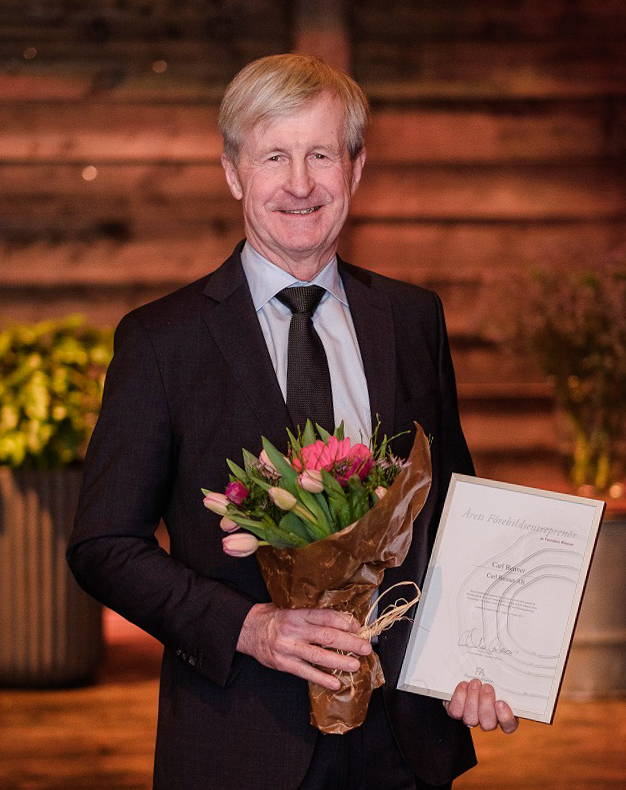
- Bennet in 2017
- Born: Carl Reinhold Adolf Bennet; 19 August 1951 (age 74); Helsingborg, Sweden
- Education: University of Gothenburg
- Occupation: Businessman
- Known for: Chairman of Getinge and Elanders
- Board member of: Getinge; Elanders; Holmen
- Spouse: Nina Bennet (m. 1981)
- Children: 1

Carl Reinhold Adolf Bennet (born 19 August 1951) is a Swedish billionaire businessman. He is the chairman of the medical technology firm Getinge and the printing company Elanders.

== Early life ==
Carl Bennet was born in 1951, and has a bachelor's degree in economics, and obtained an MBA from the University of Gothenburg in 1976.

== Career ==
In his early career, Bennet worked at Kockums in Malmö, thereafter at Electrolux in Alingsås between 1980 and 1988. During his time there, he met Rune Andersson, who would later become his business partner. In 1989, the duo departed the company and acquired Getinge Group, a struggling medical equipment subsidiary of Electrolux. Over the next two years, they managed to turn its fortunes around. In 1993, they listed Getinge on the Stockholm Stock Exchange, eventually selling off more than half of their stake, earning around $60 million, which they reinvested into other ventures. By 1997, Andersson & Bennet, their joint holding company, was dissolved in what Swedish media referred to as a friendly separation. Bennet rebranded the company under his own name, Carl Bennet AB, becoming its sole owner. He retained an 18 per cent share in Getinge and secured nearly half of the voting control. At that point, he stepped down as CEO and assumed the role of chairman.

Through Carl Bennet AB, he has significant holdings in Lifco, Getinge, Elanders and other companies.

Bennet has been credited with preventing the financial collapse of the mining company Boliden AB in the early 2000s.

As of July 2025, Forbes estimated his net worth at US$11.4 billion.

== Personal life ==
Carl Bennet is a member of the Swedish noble family Bennet and holds the title of baron (friherre). In 1981 he married physiotherapist Nina Bennet. They have a daughter and live in Gothenburg, Sweden.

== Honours ==
- H. M. The King's Medal of the 12th size gold medal on Seraphim Order ribbon.
- Fellow of the Royal Swedish Academy of Engineering Sciences.
