= Printful, Inc =

International printing company

Printful
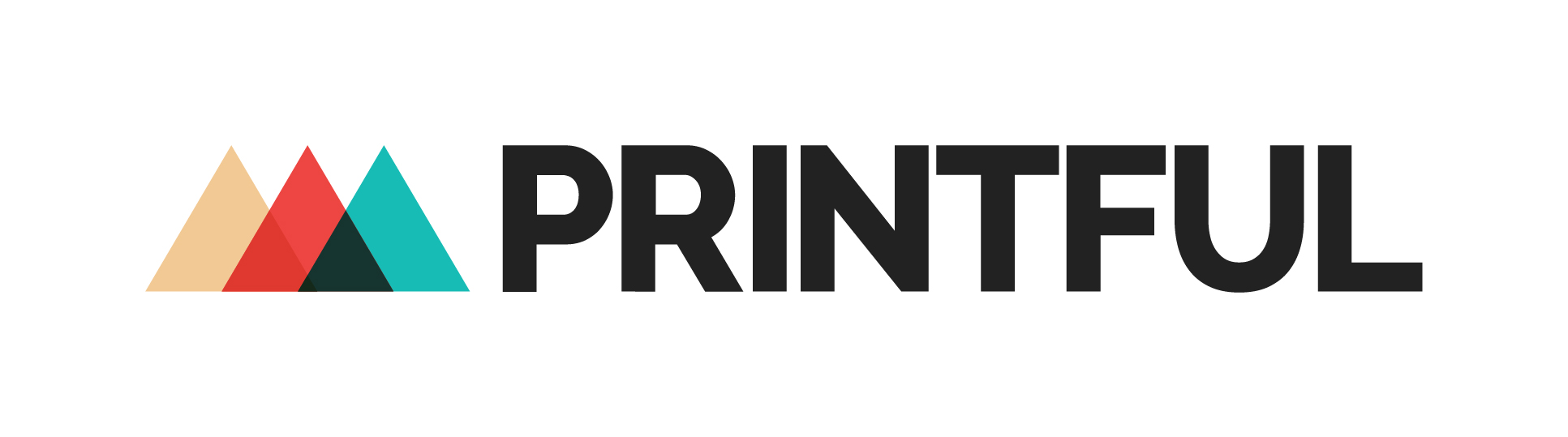
- Industry: e-commerce print on demand
- Founded: 2013
- Founder: Lauris Liberts and Davis Siksnans
- Number of employees: 2,000 (2025)
- Website: https://www.printful.com/

Printful is a print on demand company that was founded in California in 2013. The company was co-founded by Lauris Liberts and Davis Siksnans.

The company's EU headquarters is located in Riga, Latvia, with fulfillment centers in Barcelona (Spain), Riga (Latvia), Birmingham (UK), Toronto (Canada), Charlotte, NC, Dallas, TX, and Tijuana (Mexico). The company also has partner facilities in Rio de Janeiro (Brazil), Amakusa (Japan), Brisbane and Melbourne (Australia).

== History ==
Printful originated within the Draugiem Group incubator, an organization in Latvia that supports and develops new business ideas. The company launched on July 16, 2013, initially offering three products: posters, canvases, and t-shirts. Later the same year, Printful created the first integration with Shopify.

In 2015, Printful introduced the Design Maker, a tool that allows online sellers to create designs without design skills.

In 2017, it opened a fulfillment center in Riga, Latvia. The company also launched integrations with Amazon and Etsy, granting their customers instant access to online shoppers. In the subsequent years, Printful added new integrations with ecommerce platforms and marketplaces such as Squarespace, Wix, eBay, and others. This was the year when Printful acquired the domain printful.com for $100,000 and switched from their previous one theprintful.com.

In 2018, Printful opened a fulfillment center in Mexico and reached a turnover of $77.4 million.

The company was listed in Inc. 5000 in 2019, 2020 and 2021.

In 2020, it established fulfillment centers in Spain and Canada, as well as launched partnerships in Australia. The company reported revenue growth of over $200 million.

In 2021, Printful achieved unicorn status with a $130 million non-control investment from Bregal Sagemount. It also opened fulfillment centers in Dallas, Texas, and the UK, and launched a partnership in Brazil. The company reported a revenue of over $289 million in the same year, with customer all-time sales reaching $1 billion during the Black Friday Cyber Monday weekend. The same year, Printful was ranked as North Carolina's #1 Startup Employer by Forbes. On 9th of August 2021, the president of Latvia Egils Levits visited the Printful fulfilment center in Latvia.

In 2022, Alex Saltonstall was appointed as the new CEO, and Printful acquired Snow Commerce in 2023.

In November 2024, Printful announced a strategic merger with Printify, combining resources and technological capabilities while maintaining both brands separately to expand product offerings and improve fulfillment services.

=== Activities ===
Printful is an on-demand printing and fulfillment company. It prints, packages, and ships products like custom clothing, accessories, and home & living items directly to customers on the behalf of online business owners.

Printful uses printing technology from Kornit Digital and has partnered with Coloreel in embroidery techniques.

=== Public activity ===
Printful supports Baltic Pride through powering their Diversity shop. All proceeds go to the Association of LGBT and MOZAIKA, the organization behind Baltic Pride.

In 2023, Printful's investor, Bregal Sagemount, and the COFRA Foundation funded $80,000 to the LGBT House Riga, Latvia's first LGBTQ+ support center.
