= Dick Averns =

Canadian artist

- Born: 1964 (age 60–61); London, UK

Dick Averns (born March 1, 1964) is a Canadian artist who produces installations, sculptures, photography, text and performances.

== Life ==
Averns was born in London, UK in 1964.

== Work ==
Averns writings include Art in the Face of The Project for The New American Century and Cataloging Canada’s Schools of Art and Design for Artichoke magazine. Averns' recent installation Preoccupation revolves around the conceptual location of Ambivalence Blvd.
