= Stefan Olsson (businessman) =

Swedish businessman and Catholic priest

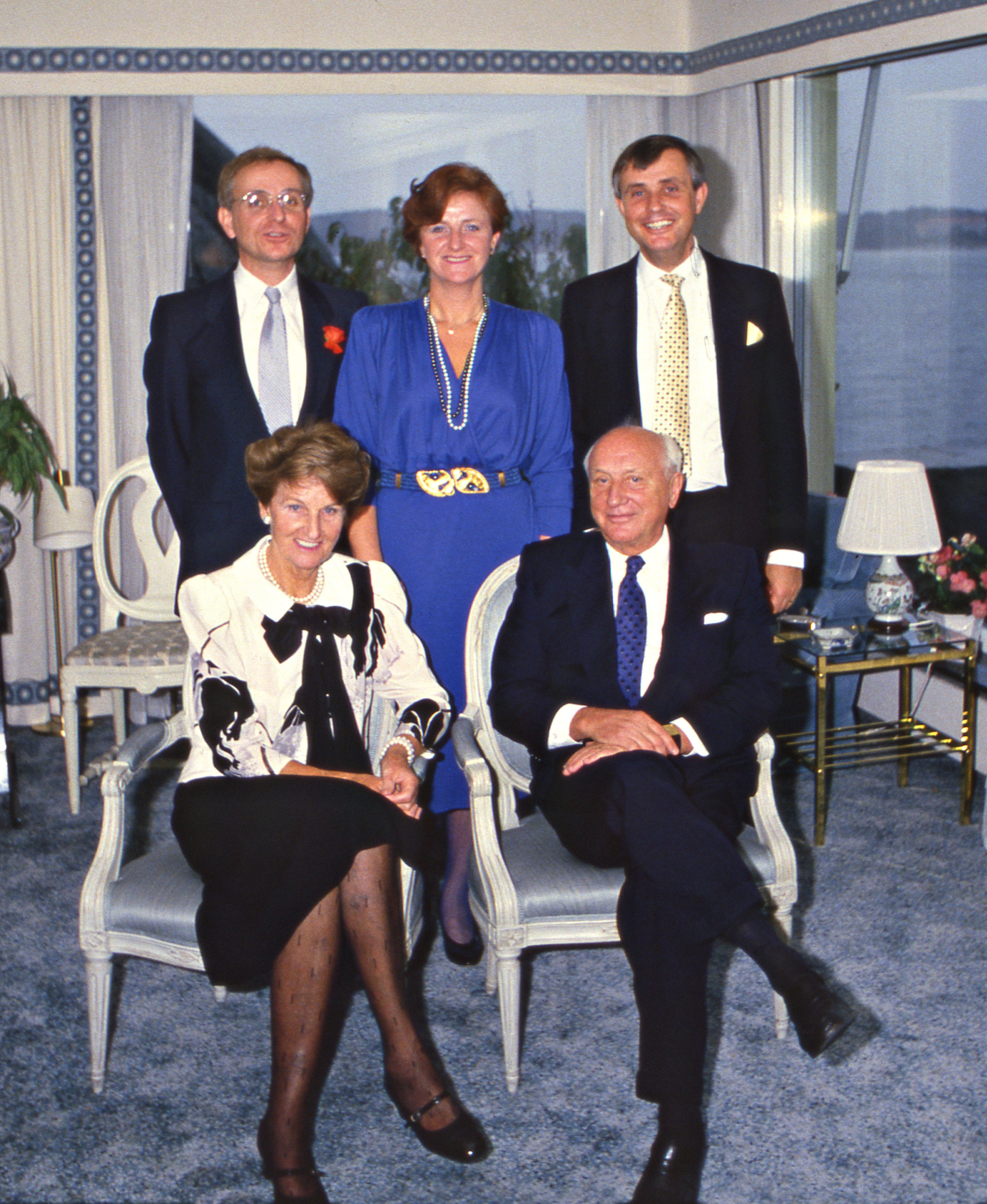
- Sitting: Birgit Olsson and Sten A Olsson. Standing: Stefan Sten Olsson, Madeleine Olsson Eriksson, Dan Sten Olsson.
- Born: 1948 or 1949 (age 76–77)
- Spouse: married
- Parent(s): Sten Allan Olsson; Birgit Andersson
- Relatives: Dan Olsson (brother); Madeleine Olsson Eriksson (sister)

Stefan Olsson (born 1948/1949) is a Swedish billionaire businessman and Catholic priest, and 24.5% owner of Stena Sphere.

Stefan Olsson is the second son of Sten Allan Olsson, the founder of Stena Sphere. His siblings Dan Olsson owns 51% and Madeleine Olsson Eriksson owns 12.5%.

He is married and lives in London, England.
