= Getinge =

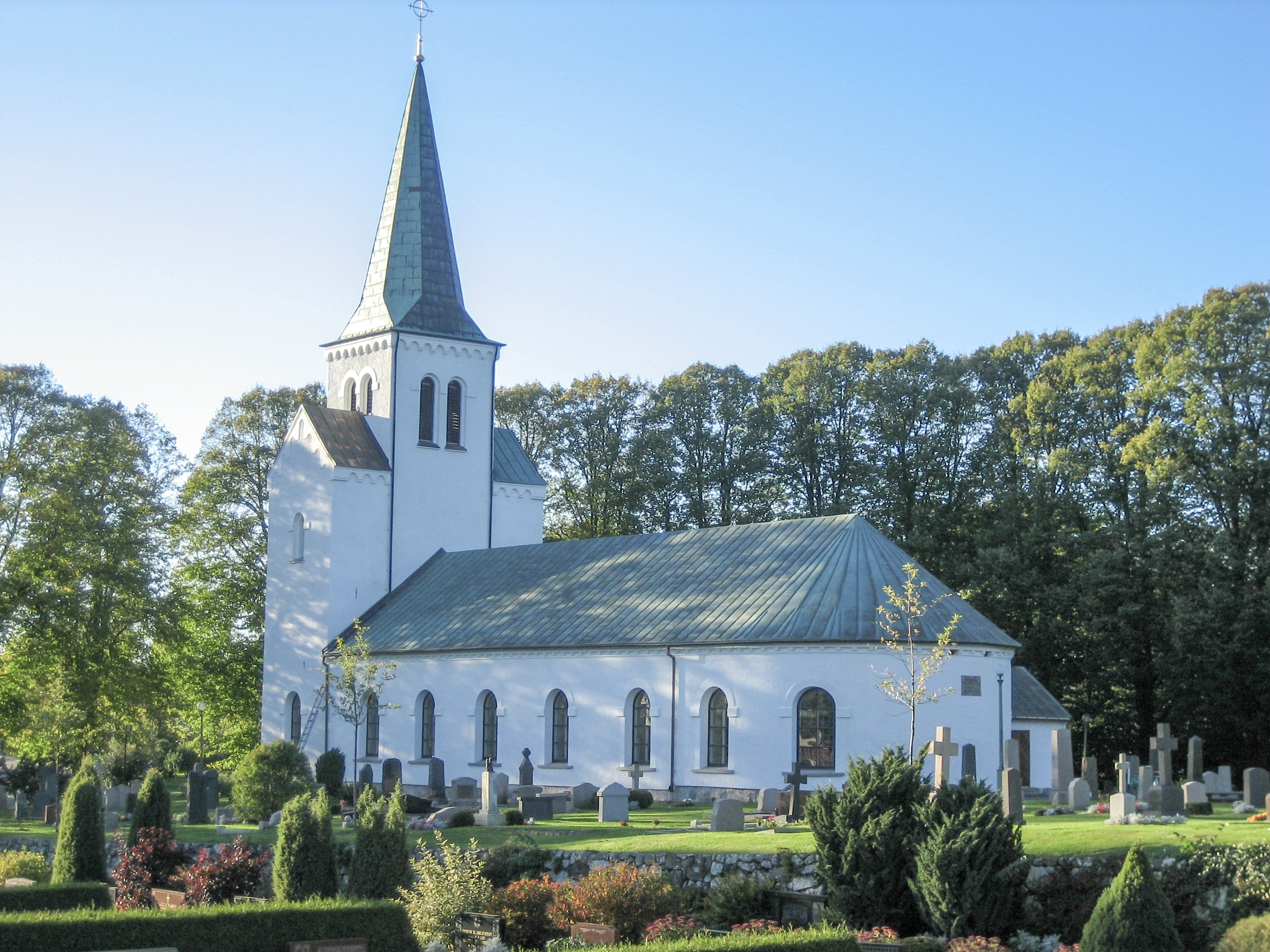
- Getinge Church

- Location within Halland Location within Sweden
- Coordinates: 56°49′N 12°44′E
- Country: Sweden
- Province: Halland
- County: Halland County
- Municipality: Halmstad Municipality

Area
  - Total: 2.42 km^{2} (0.93 sq mi)

Population (31 December 2020)
  - Total: 2,045
  - Density: 845/km^{2} (2,190/sq mi)
- Time zone: UTC+1 (CET)
  - Summer (DST): UTC+2 (CEST)

Getinge is a locality situated in Halmstad Municipality, Halland County, Sweden, with 1,843 inhabitants in 2010.

== Economy ==
Getinge Group had its headquarters in the village until 2014.

== History ==
The local assembly, the Hallandic thing took place in Getinge.
