= Roberta Smith =

American art critic (born 1948)

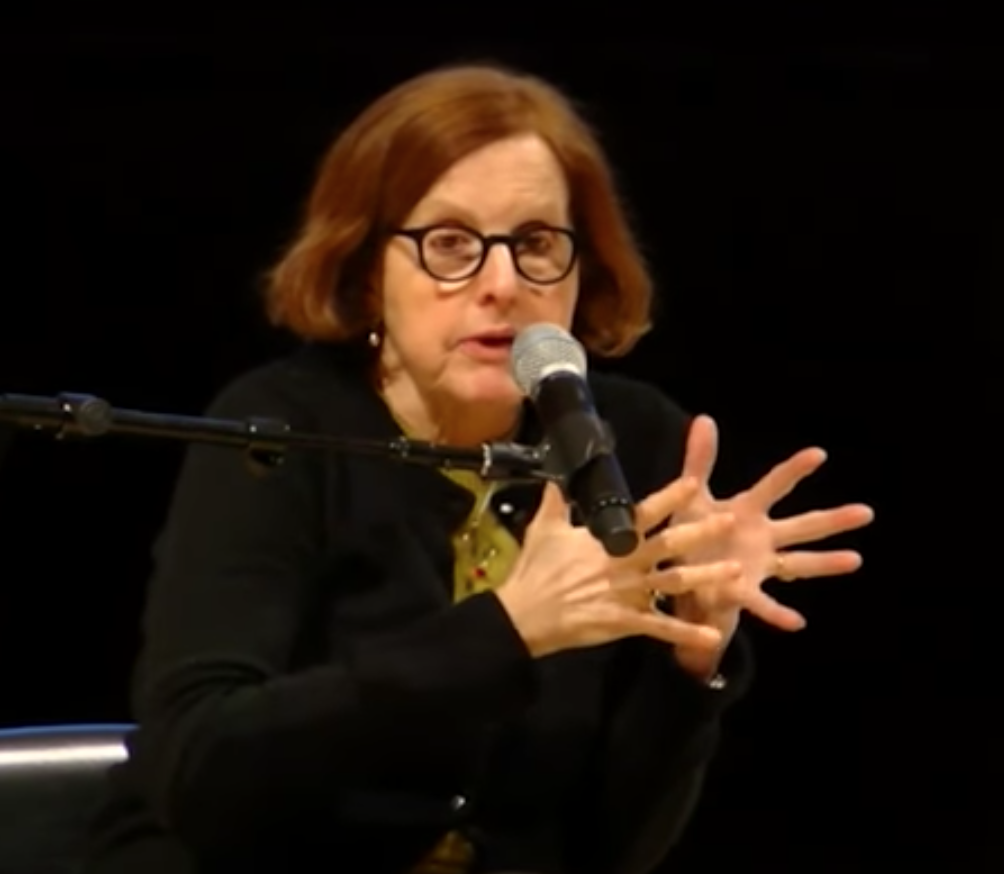
- Smith in 2014
- Born: 1948 (age 77–78); New York City, New York, US
- Education: Grinnell College
- Occupation: Art critic
- Spouse: Jerry Saltz (m. 1992)
- Writing career
- Period: 1970s–2024

Roberta Smith (born 1948) is the former co-chief art critic of The New York Times and a lecturer on contemporary art who retired in 2024. She was the first woman to hold that position at the Times.

== Early life and education ==
Born in 1948 in New York City and raised in Lawrence, Kansas, Smith studied at Grinnell College in Iowa. In the summer of 1968, she was an undergraduate intern at the Corcoran Gallery of Art in Washington, DC.

== Career ==
In 1968–1969, she participated in the Art History/Museum Studies track of the Whitney Independent Study Program (ISP), where she met Donald Judd and became interested in minimalism. After graduation, she returned to New York City in 1971 to take a secretarial job at the Museum of Modern Art, followed by part-time assistant jobs to Judd in the early 1970s and to Paula Cooper for the first three years of the Paula Cooper Gallery, beginning in 1972.

While at the Paula Cooper Gallery, Smith wrote exhibition reviews for Artforum, and subsequently for Art in America, the Village Voice and other publications. She has written and spoken about Judd on many occasions throughout her career, and upon his death in 1995, penned his New York Times obituary.

Smith began writing for The New York Times in 1986, and became the newspaper's co-chief art critic in 2011. She has written many essays for catalogues and monographs on contemporary artists, and wrote the featured essay in the 1975 Judd catalogue raisonné published by the National Gallery of Canada. She writes not only about contemporary art but about the visual arts in general, including decorative arts, popular and outsider art, design, and architecture.

Smith is a longtime advocate for museums to be free and open to the public. In 2012, she received an honorary Doctorate of Fine Arts from the San Francisco Art Institute. In 2017, the School of the Art Institute of Chicago awarded Smith her second honorary doctorate.

== Awards and honors ==
- 2003 Frank Jewett Mather Award, College Art Association.
- 2009 AICA-USA Distinguished Critic Lecture, International Association of Art Critics and Vera List Center for Art and Politics.
- 2014 Marina Kellen French Distinguished Visitor, American Academy in Berlin.

== Personal life ==
Smith married Jerry Saltz, senior art critic for New York magazine, in 1992. The couple live in an apartment in Greenwich Village.
