= Stena Metall =

Recycling company

Stena Metall AB
- Industry: Recycling and disposal
- Founded: November 18, 1939
- Headquarters: Gothenburg, Sweden
- Key people: Kristofer Sundsgård (CEO)
- Net income: 1.9 billion Euro (1st quarter 2022)
- Website: stenametall.se

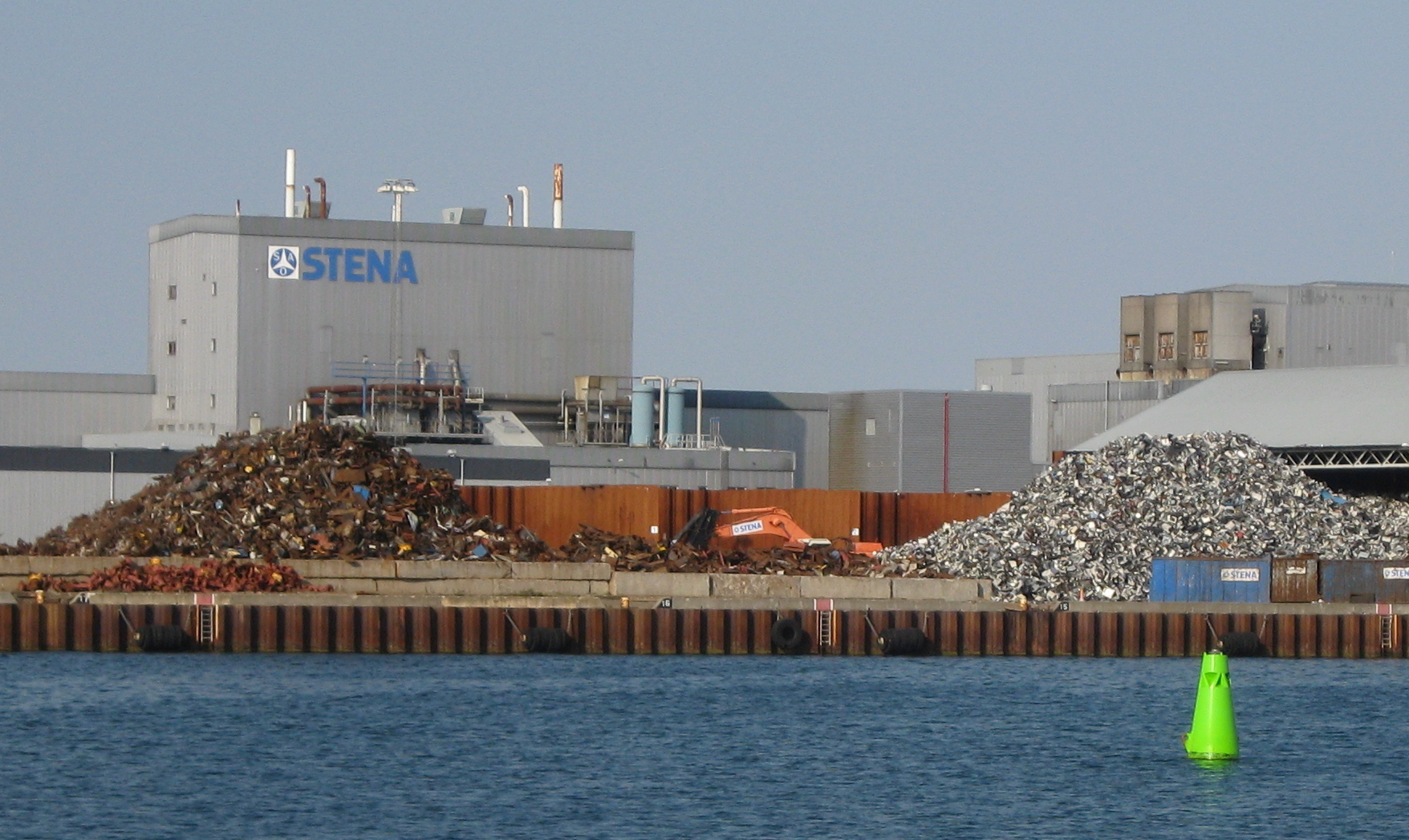
Stena Metall in Malmö.

Stena Metall AB is a company in the recycling industry that is also engaged in smelting metals, including aluminum. The recycled material is sold to various companies. Stena Metall AB operates in Sweden, Denmark, Norway, Finland, Poland, Italy, Germany, Switzerland and the United States of America. It is one of three wholly owned entities comprising the Stena Group (Stena AB, Stena Sessan AB and Stena Metall AB), and the oldest part of the group having been founded on November 18, 1939.

The CEO is Kristofer Sundsgård. The previous CEO Anders Jansson retired in 2022 after having served in this role for 23 years. Anders Jansson had recently been criticized by the local press for calculating taxes differently than the local tax authorities in Sweden.

The company is considered a major European leader within industrial recycling, and has been actively expanding its services within the field of environmental recycling since the early 1990s.

== Subsidiaries ==
Stena Metall AB owns more than 50 companies (directly or indirectly). Subsidiarity is an important value for in the company. The following chapters are each dedicated to one of the subsidiaries of Stena Metall AB:

=== Stena Recycling Holding AB ===
Through Stena Recycling Holding AB and other subsidiaries, the company collects and processes scrap metal, plastic, paper, e-waste, spent batteries, hazardous waste and chemicals at about 173 sites in seven countries. The consulting arm of Stena Recycling AB helps companies to design more sustainable products. In 2021, Stena Recycling AB started to build facilities for the shredding of lithium-ion batteries. The Swedish Energy Agency decided to give Stena Recycling AB SEK 70.7 M in 2022 as subsidies for building a facility for treating waste batteries that are a crucial step to reduce reliance on fossil fuels; this facility is designed to shred about 10,000 Mg of lithium-ion batteries per year and produce recyclable materials from them. In 2022, Stena Recycling GmbH sold its business with the recycling of heat exchangers in Germany to a subsidiary of Quantum Opportunity Fund II GmbH & Co. KG to focus its German business on the treatment of waste batteries. In the same year, Stena bought Encore Ympäristöpalvelut Oy in Finland to grow its existing waste management business in the Nordic country.

=== Stena Trade & Industry AB ===
Stena Trade & Industry AB is the owner of Stena Aluminium AB, Stena Oil AB and Stena Stål AB as well as other subsidiaries that focus on sustainable business models. Stena Aluminium AB is based in Älmhult (Sweden). It produces about 300 different aluminium alloys for foundry customers in northern Europe. The managing director is Johan Thunholm. Stena Oil AB sells bunker oil and takes care of oil sludge in cooperation with Stena Recycling. It trades in the North Sea and the passages between the North Sea and the Baltic Sea. The managing director of this subsidiary is Jonas Persson. Stena Stål delivers steel products in cooperation with steel producers. It has 15 locations in Sweden and another location in Norway. Its managing director is Stefan Svensson.

== Mergers, acquisitions & cooperations ==
In 2011 Stena Metall AB acquired Norsk Metallretur, a ferrous and non-ferrous metals recycler.

In 2021, Johnson Matthey, a British chemical company, joined in a venture with Stena Recycling to develop a process for the recycling of lithium-ion batteries and battery cell materials.

== See also ==
- Stena Sphere
- Stena Line
