= Canadian Forces Artists Program =

- Founded: 2001
- Headquarters: NDHQ

Leadership
- Director of History & Heritage: Dr. Dara Price

The Canadian Forces Artists Program (or CFAP) was established on June 6, 2001, by the then-Chief of Defence Staff Maurice Baril. Its purpose is to document, in the form of art, Canadian Forces soldiers serving at home and abroad.

== History ==
The CFAP was a successor to several other art programs. The tradition got its formal start in Canada in 1916, with the creation of the Canadian War Memorials Fund. 800 paintings, sculptures and prints were completed throughout the First World War. Most of the works submitted were by artists already serving with the military. In 1919, the CFAP displayed works in Toronto, New York, London and Montréal. These works are now located in the Canadian War Museum, the National Gallery of Canada and the Senate of Canada.

Another art program, the Canadian War Records Program, was started in 1942. This was primarily to document the forces in conflict during the Second World War. This program folded at the conclusion of the war.

After the Canadian War Records Program, no formal art programs existed in DND for over two decades. The Canadian Armed Forces Civilian Artists Program (CAFCAP) was implemented in 1968. This program began to allow civilian participation, working alongside soldiers on duty domestically and internationally. This program was cancelled in 1995 due to a lack of funds.

The current Canadian Forces Artists Program began in June 2001; there have been over 40 civilian artists participating to date, deploying in locations as diverse as Afghanistan, the Netherlands, Canadian Forces Station Alert and several bases and ships across Canada. There have been several exhibits staged, most recently the successful ongoing tour of the exhibition "Brush With War" which opened at the Canadian War Museum on December 9, 2010. This exhibition brings together over 100 works created by artists involved in the various incarnations of the program from its inception to contemporary works as recent as 2008. Artists who have recently deployed under the auspices of the program include Dick Averns and Althea Thauberger. Currently there are a number of artists slated for deployment in Afghanistan and other locales (Sudan, the high Arctic) in 2011 including Scott Waters and Nicola Feldman-Kiss.

== Competition ==
Since 2001 there have been four competitions, in 2-year intervals. The successful candidates are selected by a selection committee composed of leaders in the artistic community and national artistic and governmental institutions.

== See also ==
- Canadian official war artists
