= Stena Sphere =

Holding company

The Stena Sphere consists of the three parent companies, Stena AB, Stena Sessan AB and Stena Metall AB, wholly owned by the Olsson family. Together they make up one of Sweden’s largest family-owned corporate groups. The group’s revenue is 96 billion SEK and profit before tax for FY2023-24 is 4.3 billion SEK. CEO of the group is Dan Sten Olsson.

== History ==
The foundations to today’s Stena Sphere were laid on 18 November 1939 when the Sten A. Olsson Metallprodukter trading company was founded. In the following years the company expanded both inside and outside the country’s borders.

Sten Allan Olsson (1916–2013) was the son of the skipper and shipowner Gustav Olsson (1876–1956) from Donsö. In 1946, Sten Allan Olsson bought his first vessel with a loan of SEK 25,000 from Handelsbanken, and the shipping business started on a small scale. At the beginning of the 1960s a ferry service started between Gothenburg and Skagen in northern Denmark.

Over the years freight services using the company’s vessels became a significant part of the business. In 1972 the business was divided into two branches: Stena Line AB and Stena Metall AB. In the same year the Masthugg terminal in Gothenburg was completed. The business continued to expand and at the end of the 1970s major investments were made in offshore and RoRo vessels.

Stena Fastigheter (Property) was founded in 1980. The tanker shipping company Stena Bulk was founded in 1982. Northern Marine Group, a management company for vessels that are not Swedish-flagged, was founded in 1983 and Sten Allan Olsson's son, Dan Sten Olsson took over as CEO. Concordia Maritime was founded and listed on the stock market in 1984. During the 1990s the company expanded, including in offshore drilling.

By founding Stena Adactum at the beginning of the 2000s (decade) the Sphere was expanded to also include long-term investments in outlying business areas. Long Term Equity was founded in 2006 for long-term investments without ownership responsibility. A considerable number of the investments have focused on companies in the energy sector, including oil and offshore but also in alternative energy sources. At the beginning of the 2000s (decade) expansion also continued in offshore/drilling. The Stena sphere has made a profit every year since 1939 and has grown to include the largest ferry company in the world.

One of the company's ships, the U.S.-flagged Stena Imperative, was attacked by Iran on March 2, 2026, while the ship was in Bahrain.

== The Stena Sphere ==
In the mid-1990s, Sten Allan Olsson transferred his ownership of the Stena Sphere to his children. His daughter Madeleine's children own 6% each.

- Dan Sten Olsson (1947-) – 51%
- Stefan Sten Olsson (1949-) – 24.5%
- Madeleine Olsson Eriksson (1945-) – 12.5%
- Marie Eriksson – 6%
- Gustav Eriksson – 6%

=== Stena AB ===
Amongst its subsidiaries:

- Stena Line AB Stena Line is one of the world's largest ferry operators. The company has three business areas: Scandinavia, North Sea and Irish Sea. The route network consists of 18 strategically located ferry routes around Scandinavia and the UK. Headquartered in Gothenburg. The Managing Director of Stena Line is Carl-Johan Hagman.
- Stena Drilling Ltd is a maritime drilling contractor based in Aberdeen. The Managing Director is Erik Ronsberg.
- Stena Rederi AB supports and coordinates the shipping activities in Stena AB.
- Stena RoRo AB builds, purchases, sells and charters RoRo vessels. Many of Stena Line's vessels are owned by Stena RoRo. The Managing Director is Per Westling.
- Stena Bulk AB operates a fleet of tankers worldwide, Erik Hanell is the Managing Director.
- Stena Teknik is a central resource for expertise in ship building and ship conversions within the Stena Sphere. Technical Director is Harry Robertsson.
- Northern Marine Group Ltd is a ship management company and ship manning agency. Philip Fullerton is the Managing Director.
- Stena Fastigheter AB owns 2.1 million m^{2} and manages 300,000 m^{2} of real estate in Sweden, the Netherlands, France, China, and the United States. The CEO is Christel Armstrong Darvik.
- Stena International B.V. is a, Dutch, property owning, subsidiary.
- AB Stena Finans is the treasury and asset management entity for the whole Stena organisation. Peter Claesson is the Finance Director.
- Stena Adactum AB acquires and develops other companies. The Managing Director is Martin Svalstedt.

=== Stena Sessan AB ===
Sessanlinjen (Sessan Line) or G.F.L. (Gothenburg-Frederikshavns line), its rival in the so-called “Kattegat War,” was purchased by Stena in 1980, becoming the Stena-Sessan Line, later shortened to Stena Line. The president and CEO is Martin Svalstedt. Among its subsidiaries is:

- Concordia Maritime AB which operates a fleet of 14 modern tankers. Managing Director Kim Ullman was succeeded by Erik Lewenhaupt in 2021.

=== Stena Metall AB ===
Stena Metall recycles and processes metals, paper, electronics, batteries hazardous waste and chemicals. Its operations also include international trading in steel, metals and oil. It is the oldest part of the Stena Sphere having been founded on November 18, 1939. The CEO is Kristofer Sundsgård. It has operations in Sweden, Norway, Denmark, Finland, Poland, Germany, Italy and the United States of America.
