= Olson =

Olson may refer to:

== Places ==
- Olsón, a locality in the municipality of Aínsa-Sobrarbe, in Huesca province, Aragon, Spain
- Olson Mountain, Montana, United States
- Olson Mountain (Jackson County, Oregon), United States
- Olson Névé, Ross Dependency, Antarctica
- Olson Nunatak, Victoria Land, Antarctica
- Olson Peaks, two peaks in the Conway Range, Antarctica

== Surname ==
- Olson (surname), a list of people with the surname
- Olson Paul (born 1952), Antiguan cricketer
- Julie Olson, a fictional character on the soap opera Days of Our Lives
- Peggy Olson, a fictional character on the television series Mad Men

== Other uses ==
- Sigurd Olson Environmental Institute
- Olson (constructor), a former racing car constructor
- Oliver J. Olson & Company, a former American shipping company
- Olson Kundig, an American architectural firm
- "Olson", an instrumental by Boards of Canada from their 1998 album Music Has the Right to Children

== See also ==
- Morrison v. Olson, a case before the U.S. Supreme Court
- Olson House (disambiguation)
- Olson Building, Singapore
- USNS Captain Arlo L. Olson, a cargo ship
- SS Cynthia Olson, a cargo ship
- tz database, occasionally referred to as the Olson database
- Olsen (disambiguation)
- Olsson
- Oulson
