= Olson (surname) =

Olson (also Olsson, Oleson, Olsen) is a common patronymic surname of Scandinavian origin that literally means "son of Olaf or Ole". Olson may refer to:

== Academics ==
- Eric T. Olson (philosopher), American-born professor of philosophy
- Hope A. Olson, library scholar known for her critical analyses of classification systems
- James C. Olson (1917–2005), American historian and 17th president of the University of Missouri System
- James S. Olson, American professor of history at Sam Houston State University
- Joel Olson (1967–2012), anarchist activist and political theorist
- Oscar L. Olson (1872–1956), third President of Luther College in Iowa

== Artists and entertainers ==
- Alix Olson (born 1975), American poet
- Candice Olson (born 1964), Canadian interior designer and host of the home makeover show Divine Design with Candice Olson
- Charles Olson (1910–1970), American modernist poet
- Evan Olson (born 1967), rock singer and songwriter
- James Olson (actor) (1930–2022), American actor
- Jenni Olson (born 1962), writer, director and documentary filmmaker
- Jody Jean Olson, also known as India Summer, American porn actress
- John Olson (poet and writer) (born 1947)
- Johnny Olson (1910–1985), American radio personality and television announcer
- Kaitlin Olson (born 1975), American actress
- Mark Olson (musician) (born 1961), American country singer-songwriter
- Martin Olson (born 1956) American comedy writer
- Nancy Olson (born 1928), American actress
- Olivia Olson (born 1992), American singer-songwriter and actress
- Scott Olson, guitarist, bassist, and recording engineer

== Athletes ==
- Benji Olson (born 1975), former National Football League (NFL) player
- Bob Olson, American collegiate football player
- Carl Bobo Olson (1928–2002), American boxer
- Dante Olson (born 1997), American football player
- Drew Olson (born 1983), NFL quarterback
- Evan Olson (rower) (born 1997), American rower
- Greg Olson (baseball) (born 1960), Major League Baseball (MLB) catcher
- Gregg Olson (born 1966), MLB pitcher
- Josh Olson (born 1981), American ice hockey player
- Karl Olson (1930–2010), MLB outfielder
- Lute Olson (1934–2020), former basketball coach
- Matt Olson (born 1994), MLB first baseman
- Olivia Olson (born 2005), American basketball player
- Reese Olson (born 1999), MLB pitcher
- Sasha Olson (born 1976), Canadian softball player
- Tyler Olson (baseball) (born 1989), American baseball player

== Politicians and government officials ==
- Alec G. Olson (born 1930), American politician
- Allen I. Olson (1938–2025), American politician
- Bud Olson (1925–2002), Canadian Member of Parliament, Senator and Lieutenant Governor
- Conrad P. Olson (1882–1952) American judge and politician
- Conrad Olson (Minnesota politician) (1895–1953), American politician and lawyer
- Culbert Olson (1876–1962), American politician
- Donovan Olson (born 1965), American politician
- Edgar Olson (1937–2020), American politician
- Floyd B. Olson (1891–1936), American politician
- George W. Olson (1897–1958), American farmer and politician
- Herb Olson (born 1951), American politician
- Judy Olson Duhamel (born 1939), American politician and educator
- Kurt Olson (1948–2023), American politician
- Mark Douglas Olson, American politician
- Mark W. Olson (1943–2018), American economist and bank executive
- Ole H. Olson (1872–1954), American politician
- Pete Olson (born 1962), American politician
- Ralph O. Olson (1902–1955), associate justice of the Washington Supreme Court
- Theodore Olson (1940–2024), American politician
- William Olson (1873–1931), American politician

== Scientists and engineers ==
- Everett C. Olson (1910–1993), American zoologist, paleontologist, and geologist
- Frank Olson (1910–1953), American biological warfare scientist
- Harry F. Olson (1901–1982), American acoustic engineer
- Jean Olson Lanjouw (1962–2005), American economist
- John Melvin Olson (1929–2017), American biochemist, pioneering researcher in photosynthesis
- Mancur Olson, Jr. (1932–1988), American economist and social scientist
- Storrs L. Olson (1944–2021), American biologist, ornithologist and avian paleontologist

== Soldiers ==
- Eric T. Olson (born 1952), American admiral and commander of United States Special Operations Command
- Magnus Olson (Swedish Army officer) (1929–2018)
- Norman E. Olson (1915–1944), American World War II flying ace
- Sven-Olof Olson (1926–2021), Swedish Air Force lieutenant general
- Truman O. Olson (1917–1944), United States Army soldier posthumously awarded the Medal of Honor

== Writers and commentators ==
- Barbara Olson (1955–2001), television commentator, 9/11 victim, wife of Theodore Olson
- Lisa Olson, American sportswriter
- Sigurd F. Olson (1899–1982), American author and environmentalist
- Walter Olson (born 1954), author and blogger

== Playboy Playmates ==
- Gale Olson (born 1947)
- Hope Olson (born 1956)
- Kalin Olson (born 1975)

== Other ==
- Annette Olson, Miss North Dakota 2006
- Arthur David Olson, founding contributor of the tz database
- Clifford Olson (1940–2011), Canadian serial killer
- Dwight C. Olson (late 20th century), founder of Data Securities International
- Jim Olson, Seattle architect
- Joy Olson, American humanitarian
- Michael Fors Olson (born 1966), American Catholic bishop
- Norman Olson (born 1946), American militia movement activist
- Sara Jane Olson, former member of the Symbionese Liberation Army

== See also ==
- General Olson (disambiguation)
- Governor Olson (disambiguation)
- Justice Olson (disambiguation)
- Senator Olson (disambiguation)
- Olson (disambiguation)
- Olsen (surname)
- Olsson
- Olason
