= Sleepy Eye (disambiguation) =

Sleepy Eye is a city in Brown County, Minnesota.

Sleepy Eye may also refer to:

- Sleepy Eye Creek, a tributary of the Cottonwood River in Minnesota
- Sleepy Eye Lake (disambiguation)
- Chief Sleepy Eye, a Sisseton-Sioux chief, see Ishtakhaba

== See also ==
- Lazy eye (disambiguation)
