= Olofsson =

Olofsson is a Swedish patronymic surname meaning "son of Olof". The surname Olsson is a contraction of Olofsson. Notable people with the surname include:

- Anna Carin Olofsson (born 1973), biathlete
- Clark Olofsson (1947–2025), Swedish criminal
- Eva Olofsson (born 1952), Left Party politician, member of the parliament
- Fredrik Olofsson (born 1996), Swedish ice hockey player
- Freja Olofsson, Swedish footballer
- Gustav Olofsson (born 1994), Swedish ice hockey player
- Ingjald Olofsson, mythical king of Värmland
- Johan Olofsson (born 1976), snowboarder
- Kjell Olofsson (born 1965), former footballer.
- Linda Olofsson (born 1972), former freestyle swimmer
- Linda Olofsson (born 1973), TV-journalist
- Magnus Olofsson (born 1965), Swedish engineer
- Mats Olofsson (born 1945), Swedish curler
- Maud Olofsson (born 1955), Centre Party politician, Minister for Enterprise and Energy
- Niclas Olofsson (born 1975), former floorball player
- Pale Olofsson (born 1947), rock musician, actor
- Peter Olofsson (born 1957), former handball player
- Placid Olofsson (1916–2017), Hungarian Benedictine monk, priest, teacher and Gulag victim
- Sverker Olofsson (born 1947), TV personality
- Simon Olofsson, Swedish curler
- Victor Olofsson (born 1995), Swedish ice hockey player

== See also ==
- 8697 Olofsson, a main-belt asteroid
- Olsson
- Olson (surname)
