= Olsen House =

Olson House may refer to:

== Places and structures ==
=== United States ===
(by state, then city/town)

- Donald and Helen Olsen House, Berkeley, California, listed on the National Register of Historic Places (NRHP)
- Lena Olsen House, Pascagoula, Mississippi, listed on the NRHP in Jackson County, Mississippi
- Olsen House (Helena, Montana), NRHP-listed
- Hans Peter Olsen House, Fountain Green, Utah, NRHP-listed
- Lars and Christina Olsen House, Orem, Utah, NRHP-listed
- Ben Olsen House, Vader, Washington, NRHP-listed

== See also ==
- Olson House (disambiguation)
