= Magnus Eriksson (disambiguation) =

Magnus Eriksson (1316–1374) was the King of Sweden from 1319 to 1364 and the King of Norway from 1319 to 1355.

Magnus Eriksson may also refer to:

- Magnus Eriksson (footballer), Swedish footballer
- Magnus Eriksson (ice hockey) (born 1973), Swedish ice hockey goaltender

== See also ==
- Lars Magnus Ericsson (1846–1926), founder of Ericsson, Swedish telecom company
- Lars Magnus Ericsson (Hjälp!), fictional character on Swedish TV show Hjälp!
- Magnus (given name)
- Eriksson (surname)
