= Magnus (given name) =

Male given name

- Gender: Male
- Name day: 19 August

Magnus is a male given name. Notable people with the name include:

- Magnus (Roman usurper) (died 235)
- Magnus (consul 460) (c. 390 or 405–475)
- Magnus Forteman, 8th–9th century Frisian leader
- Magnus (bishop), Roman Catholic Bishop of Turku between 1291 and 1308
- Magnus, Prince of Anhalt-Köthen (1455–1524)
- Magnus W. Alexander, German engineer
- Magnus Arvedson, Swedish ice hockey player
- Magnus Arvidsson, several people
- Magnus Bäckstedt, Swedish road cyclist
- Magnus Bahne, Finnish footballer
- Magnus Barthelsson, Swedish guitarist
- Magnus Beronius, Swedish Archbishop
- Magnus Betnér, Swedish comedian
- Magnus Brechtken, German historian
- Magnus Büchel, Liechtenstein judoka
- Magnus Carlsen, Norwegian chess grandmaster, former world chess champion and No. 1 ranked player in the world
- Magnus Cormack, Australian politician
- Magnus Ditlev (born 1997), Danish Triathlete
- Magnus Ehrencrona (born 1978), Swedish politician
- Magnus Erlendsson, Earl of Orkney
- Magnus Faxén, Swedish diplomat and journalist
- Magnus Haara (born 1972), Swedish politician
- Magnus Hallenborg, Swedish diplomat
- Magnus Hirschfeld, German physician and sexologist
- Magnus Ilmjärv, Estonian historian
- Magnus Kirt, Estonian javelin thrower
- Magnus Körner (1808–1864), Swedish artist and scientific illustrator
- Magnus Larsson, former professional tennis player from Sweden
- Magnus Lekven, Norwegian footballer
- Magnus Lindberg, Finnish composer
- Magnus Lundgren (born 1964), Swedish sailor
- Magnus Magnusson, Icelandic-born BBC personality and Mastermind quiz-master
- Magnús Árni Magnússon (born 1968), Icelandic politician
- Magnus Malan, South African soldier and politician
- Magnus Manske, German biochemist and developer, developed first version of MediaWiki software
- Magnus Midtbø, Norwegian rock climber
- Magnus Norman, Swedish former tennis player
- Magnús Óláfsson, King of Mann and the Isles
- Magnus Olofsson (born 1965), Swedish engineer
- Magnus Olson, Swedish Army officer
- Magnús Ver Magnússon, Icelandic four-time World's Strongest Man champion
- Magnus Pyke (1908–1992), British scientist and media figure
- Magnus Riisnæs (born 2004), Norwegian footballer
- Magnus Lewis Robinson (1852–1918), American newspaper editor and Black community leader
- Magnus Rosén, ex-HammerFall bassist
- Magnus Samuelsson, Swedish strongman and former World's Strongest Man
- Magnús Scheving, creator and co-star of the children's television show LazyTown
- Magnús Orri Schram (born 1972), Icelandic politician
- Magnus Sheffield (born 2002), American cyclist
- Magnus Pääjärvi-Svensson, Swedish hockey player
- Magnus Sjöberg, Swedish jurist
- Magnus Vahlquist, Swedish diplomat
- Quaiapen (1603–1676), also known as Magnus, Native American leader in Rhode Island.
