= Ohlsson =

Ohlsson is a surname of Swedish origin. It is a contraction of the surname Olofsson, and it literally means "son of Olof". Notable people with the name include:

- Birgitta Ohlsson, Swedish politician
- Carina Ohlsson, Swedish politician
- Elin Ohlsson (born 1979), Swedish professional golfer
- Erik Ohlsson (musician), Swedish guitarist
- Erik Ohlsson (sport shooter), Swedish athlete
- Garrick Ohlsson, American classical pianist
- Hjalmar Ohlsson, Swedish athlete
- Ingrid Ohlsson, Swedish orienteering competitor
- Jan Ohlsson, Swedish actor
- Jenny Ohlsson, Swedish ambassador
- Jörgen Ohlsson (born 1972), Swedish footballer
- Patrik Ohlsson, Swedish athlete
- Peder Ohlsson, Swedish military officer
- Per T. Ohlsson, Swedish journalist
- Thomas Ohlsson, Swedish sprint canoer
- Thorild Ohlsson, Swedish athlete

== Fictional ==
- Greta Ohlsson, a character in Murder on the Orient Express by Agatha Christie

== See also ==
- Ohlson
- Olsson
