= Ohlsen =

Ohlsen is a surname. Notable people with the surname include:

- Anders Ohlsén (born 1964), Swedish canoeist
- Else Ahlmann-Ohlsen (1907–1994), Danish fencer
- Jürgen Ohlsen (1917–1994), German actor
- Nils Ohlsen (born 1967), German curator and essayist
- Russell Ohlsen (born 1955), Australian footballer

== See also ==
- Ohlson
