= Lars Olsen (disambiguation) =

Lars Olsen is a former footballer.

Lars Olsen may also refer to:

- Lars Olsen (cyclist) (born 1965), Danish cyclist
- Lars and Christina Olsen House

== See also ==
- Lars Olsson (disambiguation)
