= Gütschow =

Gütschow is a German surname. Notable people with the surname include:

- Beate Gütschow (born 1970), German artist
- Torsten Gütschow (born 1962), German footballer and manager
