= Olsen =

Olsen or Ölsen may refer to:

- Olsen (surname), people with the surname Olsen
- Fred. Olsen & Co., a large shipping company with worldwide headquarters in Oslo, Norway
- Ölsen, municipality in Rhineland-Palatinate, Germany.
- Olsen House, a historic house in Helena, Montana, U.S.

== See also ==
- Olsen Gang, a fictional Danish criminal gang in the movies of the same name
- "Olsen Olsen", a song by post rock band Sigur Rós from their album Ágætis byrjun
- Olson (disambiguation)
- Olsson
- Oulson
