= Justice Olson =

Justice Olson or Olsen may refer to:

- Conrad P. Olson (1882–1952), 48th associate justice of the Oregon Supreme Court
- Ingerval M. Olsen (1861–1943), associate justice of the Minnesota Supreme Court
- Julius J. Olson (1875–1955), associate justice of the Minnesota Supreme Court
- Ralph O. Olson (1902–1955), associate justice of the Washington Supreme Court
