= William Mellenthin =

American builder and contractor (1896–1979)

- Born: August 24, 1896; Sleepy Eye, Minnesota
- Died: 1979
- Occupations: Builder and contractor
- Known for: "Birdhouses" of the San Fernando Valley
- Spouse: Mary Ode Faulconer
- Children: William Carl Mellenthin Jr. and Michael Alfred Mellenthin
- Parent(s): Carl and Mary Mellenthin
- Relatives: Two brothers, two sisters

William Mellenthin (Aug. 24, 1896–1979) was a builder and contractor in Los Angeles and the San Fernando Valley. He built over 3,000 homes over the course of 30 years. He is well known for his iconic Birdhouse ranch homes built in the Valley from the 1940s to the 1960s, though his first house was built in 1923. He built small birdhouses, cupolas, or dovecotes into the roofs of the homes, either on the garage, living room, or bedroom. These homes were very popular with families in a post-war Los Angeles.

By combining the indoor-outdoor domestic spaces, rambling floor plans, and sturdy construction methods, the Midwesterner became a force to be reckoned with during the nascent real estate bonanza that engulfed the region in the immediate postwar era. Until recently, however, Mellenthin's work had been largely forgotten due to its humble qualities and the ubiquity of the dovecote style in the San Fernando Valley, following the wholesale adoption of his “birdhouse” treatments by other contemporaneous builders.

Mellenthin's early work was featured in Architectural Digest, Volume IX, Number 3. His company, William Mellenthin Builder, was incorporated in the mid-1950s. Early on, he worked with architect Leo F. Bachman. Today, Mellenthin Birdhouse homes are still popular with home buyers in the San Fernando Valley, and are often listed as "Classic Mellenthin" by realtors.
