= Sleepy Eye Lake (Brown County, Minnesota) =

Lake in Brown County, Minnesota

- Location within Minnesota Location within the United States
- Location: Brown County, Minnesota, United States
- Coordinates: 44°18′26″N 94°44′2″W
- Type: Natural
- Basin countries: United States
- Surface area: 263.30 acres (1,065,500 m^{2})
- Max. depth: 21 feet (6.4 m)
- Settlements: Sleepy Eye

Sleepy Eye Lake is a lake in Brown County, in the U.S. state of Minnesota. The lake is a 263-acre protected body of water. Maximum depth is about 21 feet (6.4 m).

== History ==
Sleepy Eye Lake was named for Chief Sleepy Eye. Between 1931 and 1932, The lake dried out. The lake has filled and is used for recreation and fishing. In 2020 the Minnesota Pollution Control Agency decided to remove Sleepy Eye Lake from their impaired water list. The lake has improved nutrient levels.

== See also ==
- List of lakes in Minnesota
- List of fishes of Minnesota
- Sleepy Eye Lake beach closed
