= Cobb Theatres =

American movie theater chain

Cobb Theatres III, LLC
- Trade name: Cobb Theatres
- Founded: December 14, 2000; 25 years ago
- Defunct: December 11, 2017; 8 years ago
- Fate: Acquired by CMX Cinemas
- Successor: CMX Cinemas
- Headquarters: Birmingham, Alabama, United States
- Number of locations: 25 theatres
- Key people: Robert M. Cobb (CEO & President); Ricky W. Thomas (CFO)
- Website: www.cmxcinemas.com

CinéBistro logo

Cobb Theatres was an American cinema chain based in Birmingham, Alabama. The company was established in 1924, in Fayette, Alabama, expanding through the South starting in the late 1940s and buying out General Cinema's West Central Florida theatres and Wometco Theatres in the 1990s before being bought by Regal Cinemas in 1997 and revived in 2001. Cobb operated 25 locations, the majority of which were located in Florida, with others in Alabama, Georgia, Ohio, North Carolina, and Virginia.

== History ==
R.C. Cobb, Inc. Cobb Theatres II, LLC
- Trade name: Cobb Theatres
- Formerly: Richards Theatres (1921-57); Cobb Movies (1983-92)
- Predecessor: Wometco Theatres (1925-94)
- Founded: 1921; 105 years ago
- Defunct: July 31, 1997; 28 years ago
- Fate: Acquired by Regal Cinemas
- Successor: Regal Cinemas
- Headquarters: Birmingham, Alabama, United States
- Key people: Robert M. Cobb (CEO & President)

In 1924, Jefferson A. Richards opened his family's first movie theatre in Fayette, Alabama after buying the Putman theatre from W.D. Putnam. The Putnam was first the Dixie theatre then it became the Putman. This building currently houses Nichols Frame Shop. During this year Jefferson A. Richards sold his power plant to Alabama Power prior to that he had provided power to the theatre for screenings of educational films for local schools. Lucille Richards Cobb purchased the theatre from Jefferson in 1934. In 1947, Rowland C. Cobb bought Lucille's two theatres and started building indoor and drive-in theatres throughout northern Alabama.

Notable theatres opened by Cobb included the Thunderbird Drive-In in Atlanta (the South's largest and most modern drive-in theatre) in 1963, the United States' first four-plex theatre in 1971, Cinema City 8 at Birmingham's Roebuck Shopping Center (the largest eight-plex theatre in the US) in 1978, and Sawgrass 18 (promoted as the largest theatre east of the Rocky Mountains) in 1991. Cobb operated 27 theatres by 1965. The following year, Cobb purchased eight theatres in Birmingham, Alabama and moved the company's offices to Birmingham.

Cobb Theatres expanded into South Florida by purchasing General Cinema's theatres in West Central Florida in 1992 and Wometco Theatres in 1994 (forming Cobb Theatres II following the Wometco acquisition), bringing Cobb's screen total to 315. Robert M. Cobb succeeded Rowland as the company's CEO on December 1, 1995. On June 11, 1997, it was announced that Regal Cinemas would acquire Cobb Theatres, which had 643 screens at 67 theatres, for $200 million plus $100 million in debt; Regal completed the acquisition on July 31.

Robert M. Cobb decided to re-enter the cinema industry by forming Cobb Theatres III in 2000. Cobb opened the Dolphin 19 theatre in Miami, Florida on May 25, 2001, attracting 1.4 million visitors. Cobb grew to 11 theatres with 166 screens by 2006. In 2008, Cobb introduced CinéBistro, an elevated premium dinner-and-a-movie concept, in Miami and Tampa. Cobb expanded into Colorado, Virginia and Georgia by 2011, growing to 21 theatres with 253 screens.

In October 2017, Cobb Theatres was acquired by Mexican cinema chain Cinemex; its locations were brought under its U.S. banner CMX.

CMX filed for Chapter 11 bankruptcy protection on April 25, 2020, due to the pandemic; CMX shuttered 10 underperforming theatres and was initially unable to renegotiate contracts with creditors such as landlords and movie studios. Following a six-month negotiation with creditors, CMX emerged from bankruptcy in December; landlords agreed to modified revenue-share leases where they will receive part of the theatres' profits.

On July 1, 2025, CMX Cinemas filed for Chapter 11 bankruptcy for the second time in five years, listing assets between $100,000 and $500,000 and liabilities less than $50,000. As a result, the company is looking to either sell assets or close some of its remaining locations.

== See also ==
- Death of Chad Oulson
