= Olson House =

Olson House may refer to the following places and structures in the United States:

- Charles A. and Mary Olson House, Sand Point, Idaho, listed on the National Register of Historic Places (NRHP) in Bonner County
- Olson House (South Cushing, Maine), site of Andrew Wyeth's "Christina's World", NRHP-listed
- Oscar Olson House, Braham, Minnesota, listed on the NRHP in Isanti County
- Floyd B. Olson House, Minneapolis, Minnesota, NRHP-listed
- Charles and Fae Olson House, Gresham, Oregon, NRHP-listed
- August Olson House, Portland, Oregon, NRHP-listed
- Nicolai–Cake–Olson House, Portland, Oregon, NRHP-listed
- Lewis Olson Log House, Mission Hill, South Dakota, listed on the NRHP in Yankton County
- Olson-Hanson Farm, Clifton, Texas, listed on the NRHP in Bosque County
- Olson-Nelson Farm, Clifton, Texas, listed on the NRHP in Bosque County
- Joseph and Anna Olson Farm, Clifton, Texas, listed on the NRHP in Bosque County
- Erick Lehi and Ingrid Larsen Olson House, River Heights, Utah, NRHP-listed
- Louis and Ellen Olson House, Enumclaw, Washington, NRHP-listed
- Mary Olson Farm, Kent, Washington, listed on the NRHP in King County

== See also ==
- Olsen House (disambiguation)
