= Sleepy Eye Lake =

Sleepy Eye Lake may refer to:

- Sleepy Eye Lake (Brown County, Minnesota)
- Sleepy Eye Lake (Le Sueur County, Minnesota)
