= Trinity Theological College, Singapore =

Singaporean theological college

Trinity Theological College
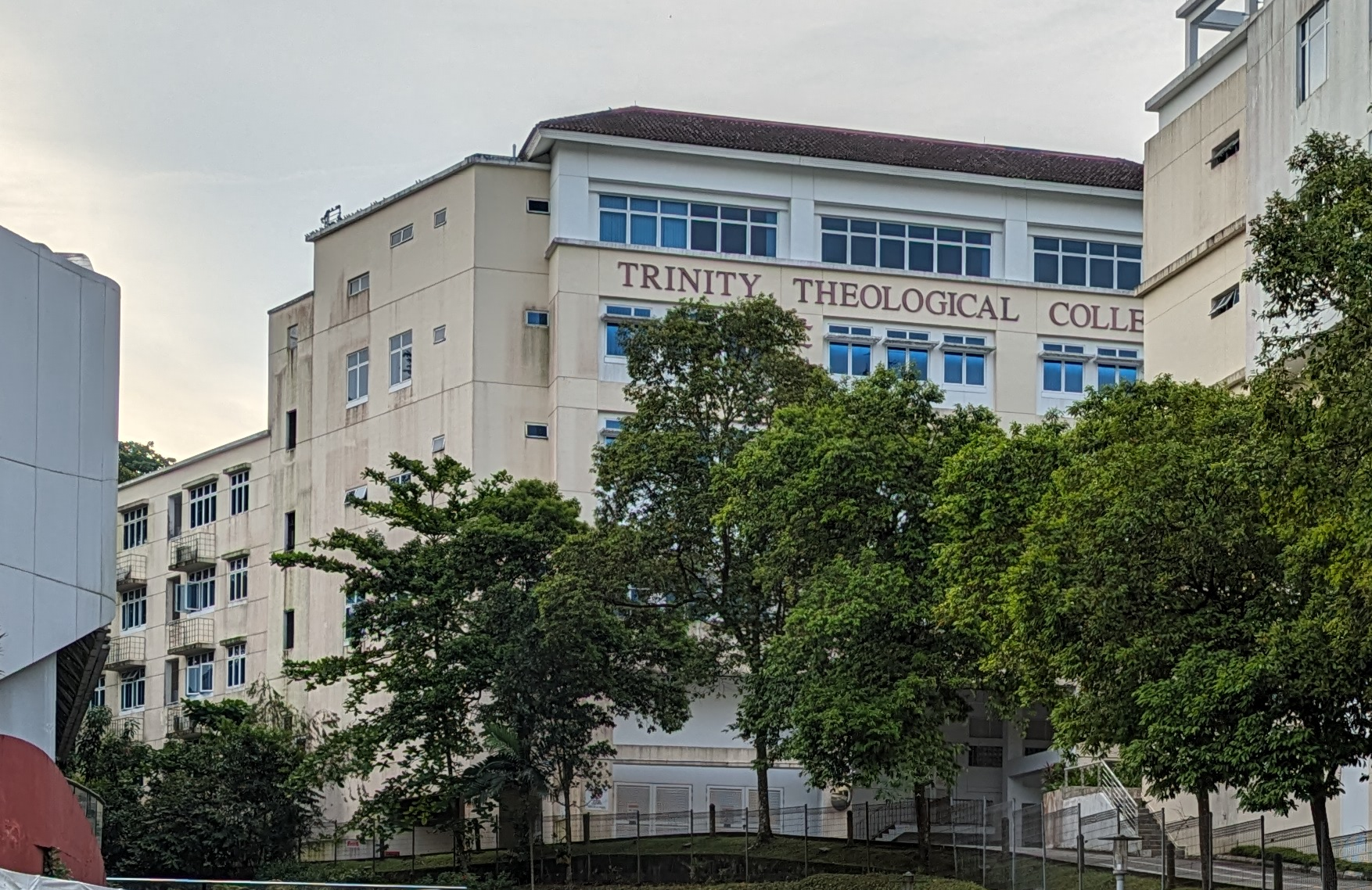
- Motto: lux mundi
- Established: 4 October 1948; 77 years ago
- Principal: Edwin Tay
- Location: 490 Upper Bukit Timah Road, Singapore, 678093; 1.362°N 103.769°E
- Website: www.ttc.edu.sg

Trinity Theological College (TTC), Singapore, was founded in 1948 as a union college between Anglicans, Methodists, and Presbyterians for theological training. The Lutherans joined the union in 1963.

Academic programmes are offered in both English and Mandarin Chinese. The current principal is the Rev Dr Edwin Tay. The college motto is lux mundi, meaning "light of the world."

== History ==
Trinity was founded in 1948 by Presbyterians, Anglicans and Methodists. When missionaries were ousted from China after the establishment of the People's Republic of China in 1949, the Synod of the Church of Malaya invited many of them to work in present-day Malaysia and Singapore. The three missions became the foundations for Trinity, especially after Singapore's independence in 1959.

Trinity is considered one of the larger theological seminaries accredited by the Association for Theological Education in South East Asia. The current student body numbers nearly 200, one-third of whom are enrolled in post-graduate studies. Nearly 1000 students regularly attend non-degree classes or are enrolled as occasional students. Alumni are from more than 50 countries around the globe.

== Degrees awarded ==
Trinity Theological College is accredited by the Association for Theological Education in South East Asia (ATESEA). It offers the following degrees:

- BD/M.Div. Degree Programmes
- Master of Theological Studies
- Postgraduate - M.Min., Th.M., MLitt, Th.D.

=== Student prizes ===
Trinity Theological College awards several annual prizes to students with outstanding achievements. Named in honor of the acclaimed American theologian and writer Frederick Buechner, the Frederick Buechner Prize for Homiletics is awarded jointly by the Chinese and English Departments, in recognition of the recipient's significant achievements in this area.

Among its student awards, Trinity Theological College also awards prizes for Greek and for Hebrew language learning. The Jerome Prize for Hebrew, named after Saint Jerome, is awarded annually to the highest achieving student of Hebrew in both the Chinese and English departments respectively. Similarly, the John Brown Prize for Greek is awarded annually to the highest achieving student of Greek in both the Chinese and English Departments respectively.

== See also ==
- Trinity Theological College Chapel
