= Harvey N. Paulson =

American politician (1903–1993)

Harvey N. Paulson (February 15, 1903 – April 9, 1993) was an American farmer and politician.

Paulson was born in Brown County, Minnesota and graduated from Sleepy Eye High School in Sleepy Eye, Minnesota. He lived with his wife and family in Sleepy Eye, Minnesota and was a farmer. Paulson served on the Brookville Township Board and was the chair. He also served on the Redwood County Conservation District Board. Paulson served in the Minnesota House of Representatives from 1957 to 1962 and as the chief sergeant at arms of the Minnesota House of Representatives from 1963 to 1972. Paulson died at his home in Sleepy Eye, Minnesota.
