= Järfälla IBK =

Floorball club in Järfälla, Sweden

- Short name: JIBK, Spiders
- Founded: 1983

Järfälla IBK, also known as the Järfälla Spiders, are a Swedish floorball club. They have previously competed in the Swedish top division SSL. They are one of Sweden's largest floorball clubs, with over 500 registered players.

They play their matches in Jakobsbergs sporthall.

== Well-known Players ==
- Niclas Olofsson, Goalkeeper (00/01-05/06) Ended his career. Two Worldcup golds (-04 och -06). 37 A-International matches
- Joakim Lindström, Forward (94/95-07/08) Ended his career. Two Worldcup golds (-02 och -04). 25 A-International matches
- Fredrik Djurling, Center (99/00-06/07) Ended his career. Two Worldcup golds (-04 och -06). Player of the year in Sweden 2008/2009
