= Mary E. Olson =

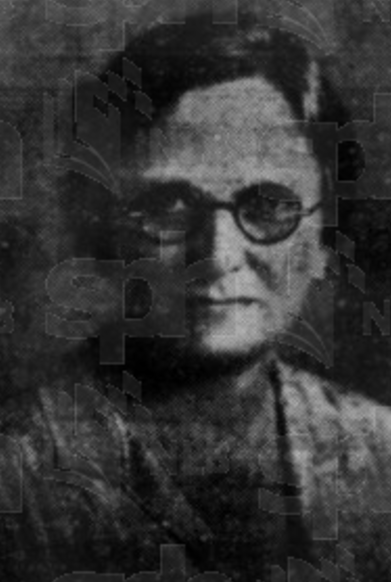
Olson in 1935

Mary E. Olson (died 13 November 1953) was an American teacher and Methodist missionary active in British Malaya. She headed the Methodist Girls' School and the Fairfield Methodist Girls' School in Singapore, as well as the Methodist Girls' School in Penang.

== Early life and education ==
Olson, who was of Swedish descent, was the daughter of a Methodist minister. She came from Minneapolis, Minnesota. She was the sister of Elizabeth Olson, who also became a missionary and assisted Olson in her work in Singapore.

== Career ==
Olson began teaching in Minneapolis in 1896. She then furthered her education in college. She enrolled in a six-month course at Hamline University, after which she became a missionary with the Minneapolis branch of the Woman's Foreign Missionary Society of the Methodist Episcopal Church. She was appointed the principal of the Methodist Girls' School in Penang in place of fellow missionary Clara Martin, who had gone on emergency leave. Olson left for Penang on 1 August 1903, arriving on 3 October and taking over as principal the week after. She taught Standard 7 and trained the school's teachers. She also led the Methodist Deaconess Home and Boarding school. She made an unsuccessful attempt to find qualified women teachers in India who would be able to come to Malaya and teach in the Methodist schools there.

In 1905, Olson was transferred to Singapore and appointed the Methodist Girls' School there. She continued to hold this position until 1910. The school was then located within a small building on Short Street. From 1907 to 1908, she also served as the principal of the Telok Ayer Girls' School. After a "furlough" in 1910, Olson was again appointed the principal of the latter school, which was renamed the Fairfield Girls' School in 1913. As principal, she oversaw the school's move from its former premises, which comprised two shophouses in Telok Ayer, to a new building on Neil Road. In 1914, she also sat on the general committee of the Young Women's Christian Association of Singapore. She continued to serve as principal until 1916 before she was again appointed the school's principal in 1918, holding this position until 1923. She again served as the school's principal in 1925.

Olson was again appointed the principal of the Methodist Girls' School in 1926. In October, she also began serving as the principal of the Methodist Girls' Afternoon School. As principal, she oversaw the school's move to a new campus on Mount Sophia. She continued in this position until 1930 when she returned to America on leave. She was returned to Fairfield Girls' School as principal in 1934. She announced her retirement in the following year and returned to Minneapolis. However, Olson was appointed the principal of the Shellabear Hall, a Methodist hostel for girls in Malacca, in 1937. In the following year, she opened the first girls' school in Pahang, which was then located within the Hainan Association building in Kuantan. She served as its founding principal. She retired from Malaya in 1940, although she continued to teach in Mississippi.

== Personal life and death ==
Olson died in a women's home for the aged in Minneapolis on 13 November 1953. She was buried at the Evergreen Community Cemetery in Afton, Minnesota. The Olson Building, completed in 1928 on the campus of the Methodist Girls' School in Singapore, was named for her.
