= Olsson =

Olsson is a common Swedish surname. It is a contraction of the surname Olofsson and it literally means "son of Olof" and seldom also "son of Ola". Notable people with the surname include:

- Åke Olsson - Swedish football player
- Åke Olsson (chess player) (1934–2009) - Swedish chess player
- Albert Julius Olsson (1864–1942), British artist
- Annelie Hastig Olsson (born 1974), Swedish politician
- Anette Olsson, better known as Anette Olzon, Swedish singer
- Arne Olsson, 20th century Lutheran bishop
- Betty Olsson (1871–1950), Swedish suffragist and peace activist
- Börje Kenny Olsson (1977–2007), speedway racer
- Christian Olsson (born 1980), athlete
- Cilluf Olsson (1847–1916), Swedish textile artist
- Dan Olsson, Swedish businessman, CEO of Stena Sphere
- Göran Hugo Olsson, Swedish film director
- Holmfrid Olsson (1943–2009), Swedish biathlete
- Ingela Olsson (born 1958), actress
- Jan Olof Olsson (1920–1974), writer and journalist
- Jeanette Olsson, Swedish singer and songwriter
- Johan Olsson (ice hockey) (born 1978), ice hockey forward
- Johan Olsson (skier) (born 1980), cross-country skier
- Jonas Olsson (born 1970), football manager and former footballer
- Jonas Olsson (born 1983), footballer
- Jörgen Olsson (badminton) (born 1976), Swedish badminton player
- Kalle Olsson (born 1984), Swedish politician
- Karolina Olsson (1861–1950), Swedish woman who hibernated for three decades
- Kenth Olsson (1945–2025), Swedish athlete
- Leif "Loket" Olsson (1942–2025), Swedish television presenter, sports journalist, radio host, and dansband singer
- Marcus Olsson (born 1988), footballer and brother of Martin
- Marie Olsson (born 1967), Swedish politician
- Martin Olsson (born 1988), footballer who plays for Blackburn Rovers in the Premier League
- Mathias Olsson (born 1973), former professional ice hockey defenceman
- Nigel Olsson (born 1949), English rock drummer
- Otto Olsson (1879–1964), composer and organist
- Peter A. Olsson (born 1941), American psychiatrist
- Peter Olsson (bassist) (–), bassist
- Salina Olsson (born 1978), Swedish Olympic football player
- Sandy Olsson, character played by Olivia Newton-John in the movie version of Grease
- Sten Allan Olsson (1916–2013), founder of Stena Line
- Tage William-Olsson (1888–1960), architect
- Tony Olsson (born 1965), former speedway runner
- Ulf Olsson (1951–2010), murderer
- Vibeke Olsson (born 1958), Swedish author and pastor
- Vic Olsson, New Zealand rower

== See also ==
- Ohlson
- Ohlsson
- Olsen (disambiguation)
- Olson (disambiguation)
