= Olason =

Olason is a surname of Scandinavian origin. People with this surname include:

- Bergþór Ólason (born 1975), Icelandic politician
- Ragnar Olason (1901–1978), Norwegian actor

== See also ==
- Olson (surname)
