= Beate Gütschow =

German artist

Beate Gütschow (born 1970 in Mainz, West Germany) is a contemporary German artist. She lives and works in Cologne and Berlin.

== Life and work ==
Gütschow studied art at the University of Fine Arts of Hamburg from 1993 to 2000, and at the Oslo National Academy of the Arts in 1997.

She served as guest professor from 2009 to 2010 at the Academy of Visual Arts in Leipzig. Since 2011 she is a professor at the Academy of Media Arts Cologne.

Gütschow's work explores the relationship between photographic representation and reality. It also investigates how our visual perception is informed and influenced by prior knowledge of other images.

=== LS Series ===
In her first series, "LS" (an abbreviation of Landschaft, or landscape) Gütschow uses photographic means to reconstruct depictions of landscape in 17th- and 18th-century paintings. With the aid of computer software, she montages scores of image fragments to create photographs that adhere to the compositional principles of the ideal landscape.

=== S Series ===
The body of work entitled "S" for Stadt (city) consists of large black-and-white photographs that are also composed of multiple images. Diverse architectural structures and geographical locations are combined within a single picture. These works clearly reference documentary photography, but at the same time contradict it with their photographic fictions.

=== I Series ===
In the series "I" (for Interior), Gütschow undertakes a critical investigation of advertising photography, composing mundane objects such as a car battery, ergonomic chair, and overhead projector into surrealistic scenes in her studio.

=== Z Series ===
In this documentary series Gütschow combines photographic fragments with computer-generated drawings. Z stands for "Zellengefängnis". "Zellengefängnis" is the German translation for a former solitary confinement prison in Berlin. Gütschow has taken photo fragments from this location and processed it together with archive material in digital drawings.

=== HC Series ===
In her series „HC“ Gütschow deals with the pictorial representation of gardens in medieval and early Renaissance art. HC stands for Hortus Conclusus.

Gütschow takes motifs from contemporary architecture surroundings and transfers them to a parallel perspective with the help of photogrammetry. She uses this historical reference as a tool not only to challenge the viewer's perception but also to negotiate current developments in 3D photography.

Gütschow has received numerous awards, including the ars viva prize awarded by the Kulturkreis der deutschen Wirtschaft (2006) and the Otto-Dix-Prize/IBM Art Award for New Media, Gera (2001). In 2001 she also held a fellowship at Villa Aurora in Los Angeles.

Gütschow was one of the urbanites portrayed in the 2009 documentary In Berlin by Michael Ballhaus and Ciro Cappellari.

=== K Series ===
Gütschow uses documentary photography and text to address the issue of the climate crisis. She photographs protests and resistance, while also documenting the damage caused by the climate crisis.

== Solo exhibitions (select) ==
- 2024 Widerstand, Flut, Brand, Widerstand. Fotoarsenal, Vienna
- 2019/2020 „LS“ und „S“, Berlinische Galerie, Berlin
- 2018 Produzentengalerie, Hamburg
- 2017 O+O Depot, Berlin
- 2011 Fotogalleriet, Oslo
- 2011 St Paul St Gallery, Auckland, New Zealand
- 2011 ph-projecs, Berlin
- 2010 Galerie Barbara Gross, Munich
- 2010 Produzentengalerie, Hamburg
- 2009 Kunsthalle im Lipsiusbau, Staatliche Kunstsammlungen Dresden
- 2009 Sonnabend Gallery, New York
- 2008 Kunsthalle Nürnberg, Nuremberg
- 2008 Haus am Waldsee, Berlin
- 2007 Museum of Contemporary Photography, Chicago
- 2007 ArtSway, Hampshire, UK
- 2005 Produzentengalerie, Hamburg
- 2004 Galerie Barbara Gross, Munich
- 2004 Danziger Projects, New York

== Works in public collections (selected) ==
Works of Beate Gütschow can be found in the collections of the Solomon R. Guggenheim Museum, Kunsthalle Hamburg, Los Angeles County Museum of Art, Kunsthaus Zurich, Pinakothek der Moderne in Munich, Metropolitan Museum of Art, Saint Louis Art Museum, San Francisco Museum of Modern Art, Staatlichen Kunstsammlungen Dresden and in the Staedel Museum, Frankfurt.

== Literature und sources ==
- PHOTOGRAPHIC MATERIALS. Archives and New Tools, edited by Alex Grein, Beate Gütschow, Susanne Holschbach, Inga Schneider, Cologne 2023, pp. 12–16.
- Expect the Unexpected. Current Concepts for Photography edited by Michael Reisch, Barbara J. Scheuermann, Bonn 2023. Exh. Cat. Kunstmuseum Bonn. Bonn, 2023, pp. 108–109, 138–143.
- Licht ins Dunkel: Wohin entwickelt sich die künstlerische Fotografie?. Edited by Christina Leber, Katrin Thomschke, Heidelberg 2022, pp. 58–65
- Arts contemporains & anthropocène. Edited by Danièle Méaux, Jonathan Tichit, Paris 2022, pp.214–222
- darktaxa- project no publication edited by darktaxa-project, the artists, Cologne 2022, pp. 28–29, 38–45, 59, 62–63, 72, 76, 89, 114–118, 131, 143, 168–171, 205–206, 258–259, 260, 276, 318–319, 326–327, 418, 428–432, 434–470, 539, 570, 665.
- Die Stadt und der Erdkreis edited by Gregor Hens, Berlin 2021, p. 172–173.
- Subjekt und Objekt. Foto Rhein Ruhr, Edited by Dana Bergmann, Ralph Goertz, Gregor Jansen, Cologne 2020, pp. 198, 258–259.
- LAND_SCOPE. Edited by Ulrich Pohlmann, Christina Leber, Katharinner Zimmermann, Erec Gellautz, Munich, 2019. Exh. Cat. Stadtmuseum München. Munich, 2019, pp. 20–27.
- Fiction and Fabrication. Edited by Pedro Gadanho, Munich, 2019. Exh. Cat. MAAT – Museum of Art, Architecture and Technology, Lisboa, 2019, pp. 146–149.
- Architektur im Bild. Edited by Manuela Reissmann. Exh. cat. Kunsthaus Zürich. Zurich, 2017, pp. 85.
- Space. Edited by Stephan Barber and Michael Benson. Exh. cat. on the occasion of the Prix Pictet. London, 2017, pp. 73, 106–07.
- The History Show. Edited by Uwe Fleckner and Bettina Steinbrügge. Reader Kunstverein Hamburg. Hamburg, pp. 28–37.
- Florian Ebner, Anna-Catharina Gebbers, Maren Lübke Tidow, Friedrich Tietjen: Beate Gütschow: ZISLS. Heidelberg, 2016.
- Gärten der Welt. Edited by Albert Lutz and Hans von Trotha. Exh. cat. Museum Rietberg Zurich. Cologne, 2016, p. 212.
- Martin Engler and Max Hollein. Gegenwartskunst 1945 bis Heute im Städel Museum. Ostfildern, 2016, p. 335.
- Imagine Reality. Edited by Ray Fotografieprojekte Frankfurt/RheinMain. Exh. cat. MMK Museum für moderne Kunst Frankfurt am Main, Museum für angewandte Kunst Frankfurt, Forum für Fotografie Frankfurt. Heidelberg and Berlin, 2015, pp. 44–47.
- Radikal Modern. Edited by Thomas Köhler and Ursula Müller. Exh. cat. Berlinische Galerie Berlin. Tübingen and Berlin, 2015, pp. 194–95.
- Ewing, William A. Landmark. The Fields of Landscape Photography. London, 2014, p. 226.
- Concrete – Photography und Architecture. Janser, Daniela, Thomas Seelig and Urs Stahel, ed. Zurich 2013, p. 157.
- Seduced By Art: Photography Past and Present. The National Gallery ed. London 2012, pp. 184.
- Lost Places – Orte in der Photographie. Kunsthalle Hamburg, ed. Bielefeld, 2012, S. 44- 49, 140–141.
- Malerei in der Fotografie. Strategien der Aneignung.Städel Museum, ed. Heidelberg 2012.
- BELVEDERE – Warum ist Landschaft schön? Arp Museum Bahnhof Rolandseck, ed. Bielefeld. 2011. (pp. 58–61)
- Veto – Zeitgenössischen Positionen in der deutschen Fotografie. Deichtorhallen Hamburg, ed. Heidelberg Berlin, 2011. (pp. 68–75)
- XL Photography 4. Deutsche Börse AG, ed. Ostfildern, 2011, (pp. 74–77)
- WERT/SACHE. Gebbers, Anna-Catharina, ed. Exh. Cat. Moderne Kunst Nürnberg. Berlin, 2011. (pp. 15–16)
- Felicità – Freude, Glück und Emotionen in der zeitgenössischen Kunst. Denaro, Dolores, ed. Exh. cat. CentrePasquArt. Biel, 2010, pp. 84–89.
- Double Fantasy – Jan Jedlička, Michal Šeba, Beate Gütschow. Exh. cat. Galerie Rudolfinum. Prague, 2010, pp. 47–52, 96–109.
- Realismus – Das Abenteuer der Wirklichkeit. Edited by Christiane Lange and Nils Ohlsen. Exh. cat. Kunsthalle Emden, Kunsthalle der Hypo-Kulturstiftung, Munich. Emden and Munich, 2010.
- Oliver-Smith, Kerry. Project Europa: Imagining the (Im)possible. Exh. cat. Samuel P. Harn Museum of Art, University of Florida. Gainesville, 2010.
- Unruh, Rainer. “Beate Gütschow: ‘I’.” Kunstforum International, no. 201 (March–April 2010), pp. 281–282.
- Beate Gütschow: S. Exh. cat. Staatliche Kunstsammlungen Dresden. Ostfildern, 2009.
- Gefter, Philip. Photography After Frank. New York, 2009.
- Beate Gütschow LS / S. Edited by Lesley A. Martin. Exh. cat. Haus am Waldsee, Berlin. Cologne, 2008.
- Lübbke-Tidow, Maren. "Aufführungen des Glücks und seiner Zerstörung." Kunst-Bulletin (March 2008), pp. 38–44.
- Beate Gütschow LS / S. Edited by Lesley A. Martin. Exh. cat. Museum of Contemporary Photography, Chicago. New York, 2007.
- Think with the Senses, Feel with the Mind: Art in the Present Tense, vol. 2. Edited by Harriet Bee and Robert Storr. Exh. cat. 52nd Biennale, Venice, 2007.
- "Beate Gütschow." In Made in Germany. Edited by Martin Engler. Exh. cat. Kestnergesellschaft, Kunstverein Hannover, Sprengel Museum, Hanover. Ostfildern, 2007.
- Reality Bites: Making Avant-garde Art in Post-Wall Germany / Kunst nach dem Mauerfall. Edited by Sabine Eckmann. Exh. cat. Mildred Lane Kemper Art Museum, St. Louis, MO. Ostfildern, 2007.
- Amelunxen, Hubertus von. “Die Erzählung vor dem Bild.” In ars viva 2006/2007: Erzählung/Narration, Galerie Neue Meister. Exh. cat. Staatliche Kunstsammlungen Dresden, 2006, pp. 66–96.
- Bischoff, Ulrich. “Gestaltete Landschaften.” In ars viva 2006/2007: Erzählung/Narration, Galerie Neue Meister. Exh. cat. Staatliche Kunstsammlungen Dresden, 2006, pp. 97–106.
- Zwischen Wirklichkeit und Bild: Positionen deutscher Fotografie der Gegenwart. Edited by Rei Masuda et al. Exh. cat. The National Museum of Modern Art. Tokyo, 2005.
- Gefter, Philip. "The Picnic That Never Was." The New York Times, November 21, 2004, p. 34.
- Gebbers, Anna-Catharina. "Beate Gütschow." Artist Kunstmagazin, Nr. 51 (2002), pp. 4–7.
