= Lars Olsson =

Lars Olsson may refer to:

- Lars Olsson (cross-country skier), Swedish former cross-country skier
- Lars Olsson (alpine skier) (born 1944), Swedish former alpine skier
- Lars Olsson (swimmer) from Swimming at the 1980 Summer Paralympics
- Lars Olsson (bandy) (born 1947), Swedish bandy player

== See also ==
- Lars Olsen (disambiguation)
