= Ohlson =

Ohlson is a surname of Swedish origin. It is a contraction of the surname Olofsson and it literally means "son of Olof". It may refer to

- Bertil Ohlson, Swedish athlete
- Carl-Erik Ohlson, Swedish athlete
- Elisabeth Ohlson, Swedish photographer
- Erik Ohlson, Swedish-born British shipping magnate
- Olle Ohlson, Swedish athlete
- Ted Ohlson, Australian rules footballer

== See also ==
- Clas Ohlson, a Swedish retail company
- Ohlson Baronets
- Ohlsson
- Ohlsen
