= Olson Mountain (Jackson County, Oregon) =

Extinct shield volcano in Oregon

Highest point
- Elevation: 5,040 ft (1,540 m)
- Coordinates: 42°39′44″N 122°32′9″W

Geology
- Mountain type: Shield volcano

Olson Mountain, located in Jackson County, Oregon in the US is an extinct shield volcano. It created the Table Rocks north of Medford, Oregon.

== Geography ==
Olson Mountain is south of Prospect, Oregon, northeast of Medford, Oregon, northwest of other shield volcanoes such as Mount McLoughlin, Brown Mountain, Pelican Butte, and Rustler Peak, and east of Lost Creek Lake.

== Geology ==
Upper and Lower Table Rock, two plateaus north of Medford, are lava flows that were created when Olson Mountain erupted. They were eroded when the Rogue River carved into the rock, causing the lava to collapse.
