= Niclas Olofsson =

Swedish floorball player

Niclas Olofsson (born 1975 in Linköping, Sweden) is a Swedish former floorball goalkeeper, playing for Järfälla IBK and the Swedish national team. He won the Floorball World Championships in 2002, 2004 and 2006, and quit his career after the championships in 2006.
