= Eva Olofsson =

Swedish politician (born 1952)

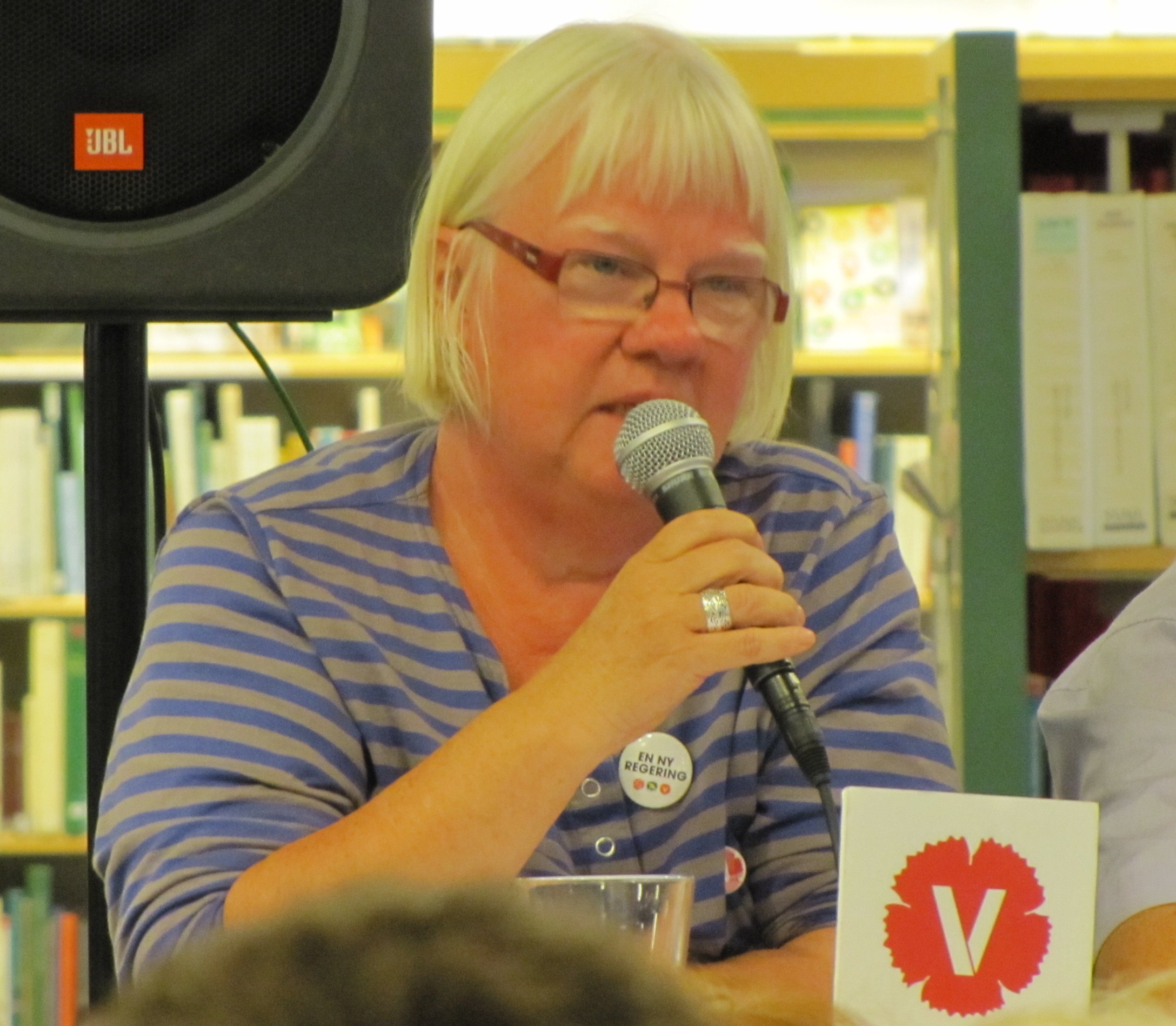
Eva Olofsson during the 2010 election campaign.

Eva Olofsson (born 1952) is a Swedish Left Party politician. She was a member of the Riksdag 2006–2014 and Councillor of the Västra Götaland Regional Council in 2014–2021.
