= Lazy eye =

Lazy eye refers to several specific ophthalmic disorders:

== Medicine ==
- Amblyopia, a disorder of visual development in which the brain partially or wholly ignores input from one or both eyes
- Strabismus, a disorder of ocular alignment in which the eyes aim in different directions
- Ptosis (eyelid), drooping or falling of the upper or lower eyelid

== Art and entertainment ==
- Lazy Eye (film), 2016 American film
- "Lazy Eye" (Goo Goo Dolls song), a song recorded by the Goo Goo Dolls for the soundtrack of the 1997 film Batman & Robin
- "Lazy Eye" (Silversun Pickups song), the third single from Silversun Pickups' debut album Carnavas
