= Magnus Arvidsson =

Magnus Arvidsson may refer to:

- Magnus Arvidsson (footballer) (born 1973), Swedish football player
- Magnus Arvidsson (javelin thrower) (born 1983), Swedish javelin thrower
