= National Register of Historic Places listings in Bosque County, Texas =

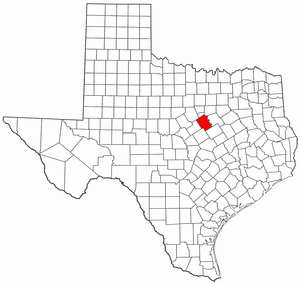
Location of Bosque County in Texas

This is a list of the National Register of Historic Places listings in Bosque County, Texas.

This is intended to be a complete list of properties and districts listed on the National Register of Historic Places in Bosque County, Texas. There are two districts and 38 individual properties listed on the National Register in the county. An additional, formerly listed property has since been removed. Two individual properties are State Antiquities Landmarks. One of these, along with two others, are Recorded Texas Historic Landmarks. One district contains additional Recorded Texas Historic Landmarks.

This National Park Service list is complete through NPS recent listings posted May 30, 2025.

== Current listings ==
The publicly disclosed locations of National Register properties and districts may be seen in a mapping service provided.

	Name on the Register	Image	Date listed	Location	City or town	Description
1	J. H. Bekken House	J. H. Bekken House	July 22, 1983 (#83003095)	NW of Clifton; 31°47′47″N 97°36′48″W	Clifton	Part of Norwegian Settlement of Bosque County Thematic Resource
2	Bosque County Courthouse	Bosque County Courthouse	April 13, 1977 (#77001427)	Public Sq. 31°55′22″N 97°39′26″W	Meridian	State Antiquities Landmark, Recorded Texas Historic Landmark
3	Bosque River Bridge	Bosque River Bridge	February 18, 2025 (#100011449)	0.3 miles (0.48 km) NE of JCT SH 6; 31°55′09″N 97°39′44″W	Meridian vicinity	
4	Brandhagen Houses		July 22, 1983 (#83003096)	W of Clifton on FM 182; 31°46′17″N 97°40′20″W	Clifton	Part of Norwegian Settlement of Bosque County TR
5	Bridges-Johnson House	Bridges-Johnson House	October 25, 1979 (#79003447)	Off TX 6, SW of Meridian; 31°54′24″N 97°39′54″W	Meridian	
6	Brogdon Farm	Brogdon Farm	July 22, 1983 (#83003097)	W of Clifton; 31°47′15″N 97°42′06″W	Clifton	Part of Norwegian Settlement of Bosque County TR
7	Bronstad House	Bronstad House	July 22, 1983 (#83003098)	SW of Clifton; 31°45′40″N 97°38′32″W	Clifton	Part of Norwegian Settlement of Bosque County TR
8	John and Mary Colwick Farm	John and Mary Colwick Farm	July 22, 1983 (#83003099)	SW of Clifton; 31°42′37″N 97°41′50″W	Clifton	Recorded Texas Historic Landmark; part of Norwegian Settlement of Bosque County TR
9	Colwick Homestead		November 24, 2015 (#15000835)	Address restricted	Clifton	
10	Peder Dahl Farm	Peder Dahl Farm	July 22, 1983 (#83003100)	SW of Clifton on FM 219; 31°45′12″N 97°36′23″W	Clifton	Part of Norwegian Settlement of Bosque County TR
11	Ellingson Farm		July 22, 1983 (#83003101)	W of Clifton; 31°46′43″N 97°42′40″W	Clifton	Part of Norwegian Settlement of Bosque County TR
12	Even and Petrine Erickson Farm		July 22, 1983 (#83003102)	NW of Clifton; 31°52′16″N 97°41′24″W	Clifton	Part of Norwegian Settlement of Bosque County TR
13	Ole and Elizabeth Finstad Homesite		July 22, 1983 (#83003103)	SW of Clifton on FM 219; 31°43′51″N 97°43′40″W	Clifton	Part of Norwegian Settlement of Bosque County TR
14	First National Bank Building	First National Bank Building	November 7, 1979 (#79002919)	Main and Morgan Sts. 31°55′24″N 97°39′27″W	Meridian	State Antiquities Landmark
15	Adolf and Christine Godager Homesite	Adolf and Christine Godager Homesite	July 22, 1983 (#83003104)	NW of Clifton; 31°49′38″N 97°45′44″W	Clifton	Part of Norwegian Settlement of Bosque County TR
16	Gunsten and Lofise Grimland House	Gunsten and Lofise Grimland House	July 22, 1983 (#83003105)	SW of Clifton on FM 219; 31°43′34″N 97°42′38″W	Clifton	Part of Norwegian Settlement of Bosque County TR
17	Keddel and Liv Grimland Farm	Keddel and Liv Grimland Farm	July 22, 1983 (#83003106)	SW of Clifton on FM 219; 31°43′30″N 97°42′23″W	Clifton	Part of Norwegian Settlement of Bosque County TR
18	Hoff-Ulland Farm	Hoff-Ulland Farm	July 22, 1983 (#83003107)	SW of Clifton; 31°43′27″N 97°38′02″W	Clifton	Part of Norwegian Settlement of Bosque County TR
19	Hog Creek Archeological District		July 20, 1977 (#77001428)	Address restricted	Mosheim	
20	James Jens and Martha Jenson House	James Jens and Martha Jenson House	July 22, 1983 (#83003108)	NW of Clifton on FM 2136; 31°49′24″N 97°38′51″W	Clifton	Part of Norwegian Settlement of Bosque County TR
21	Christen and Johanne Knudson Farm	Christen and Johanne Knudson Farm	July 22, 1983 (#83003109)	SW of Clifton on FM 219; 31°45′24″N 97°38′19″W	Clifton	Part of Norwegian Settlement of Bosque County TR
22	A. H. Lahlum House	A. H. Lahlum House	July 22, 1983 (#83003110)	SW of Clifton; 31°42′19″N 97°40′09″W	Clifton	Part of Norwegian Settlement of Bosque County TR
23	Martin Larson House	Martin Larson House	July 22, 1983 (#83003111)	SW of Clifton; 31°44′10″N 97°45′43″W	Clifton	Part of Norwegian Settlement of Bosque County TR
24	Eric and Martha Linberg Farm	Eric and Martha Linberg Farm	July 22, 1983 (#83003112)	W of Clifton; 31°47′06″N 97°40′39″W	Clifton	Part of Norwegian Settlement of Bosque County TR
25	Lumpkin Building	Lumpkin Building	April 9, 1998 (#98000355)	101 Main St. 31°55′24″N 97°39′25″W	Meridian	
26	Norway Mill	Norway Mill	July 22, 1983 (#83003113)	SW of Clifton on FM 182; 31°41′36″N 97°39′24″W	Clifton	Recorded Texas Historic Landmark; part of Norwegian Settlement of Bosque County TR
27	Joseph and Anna Olson Farm	Joseph and Anna Olson Farm	July 22, 1983 (#83003114)	SW of Clifton on FM 182; 31°45′12″N 97°39′36″W	Clifton	Part of Norwegian Settlement of Bosque County TR
28	Olson-Hanson Farm	Olson-Hanson Farm	July 22, 1983 (#83003115)	SW of Clifton on FM 219; 31°44′47″N 97°39′13″W	Clifton	Part of Norwegian Settlement of Bosque County TR
29	Olson-Nelson Farm	Olson-Nelson Farm	July 22, 1983 (#83003116)	W of Clifton; 31°47′24″N 97°39′44″W	Clifton	Part of Norwegian Settlement of Bosque County TR
30	John Pederson Farm	John Pederson Farm	July 22, 1983 (#83003117)	SW of Clifton on FM 219; 31°43′40″N 97°43′07″W	Clifton	Part of Norwegian Settlement of Bosque County TR
31	Ole and Ann Pierson Farm	Ole and Ann Pierson Farm	July 22, 1983 (#83003118)	W of Clifton; 31°45′37″N 97°43′05″W	Clifton	Part of Norwegian Settlement of Bosque County TR
32	Carl and Sedsel Questad Farm	Carl and Sedsel Questad Farm	July 22, 1983 (#83003119)	W of Clifton; 31°46′39″N 97°40′50″W	Clifton	Part of Norwegian Settlement of Bosque County TR
33	Reeder-Omenson Farm	Reeder-Omenson Farm	July 22, 1983 (#83003120)	SW of Clifton on FM 182; 31°41′31″N 97°39′30″W	Clifton	Part of Norwegian Settlement of Bosque County TR
34	Hans and Berthe Reierson House	Hans and Berthe Reierson House	July 22, 1983 (#83003121)	SW of Clifton; 31°45′04″N 97°44′49″W	Clifton	Part of Norwegian Settlement of Bosque County TR
35	Jens and Kari Ringness Farm	Jens and Kari Ringness Farm	July 22, 1983 (#83003122)	Sw of Clifton on FM 219; 31°43′23″N 97°41′41″W	Clifton	Part of Norwegian Settlement of Bosque County TR
36	Tom and Martha Rogstad Farm	Tom and Martha Rogstad Farm	July 22, 1983 (#83003123)	W of Clifton; 31°46′04″N 97°46′39″W	Clifton	Part of Norwegian Settlement of Bosque County TR
37	Tobias and Wilhelmine Schultz Farm	Tobias and Wilhelmine Schultz Farm	July 22, 1983 (#83003124)	SW of Clifton; 31°44′50″N 97°44′42″W	Clifton	Part of Norwegian Settlement of Bosque County TR
38	Gunarus and Ingerborg Shefstad House	Gunarus and Ingerborg Shefstad House	July 22, 1983 (#83003125)	N of Clifton; 31°47′44″N 97°35′13″W	Clifton	Part of Norwegian Settlement of Bosque County TR
39	Upper Settlement Rural Historic District	Upper Settlement Rural Historic District	July 22, 1983 (#83003126)	E of Granfills Gap off TX 22; 31°47′02″N 97°45′58″W	Cranfills Gap	Includes Recorded Texas Historic Landmarks; part of Norwegian Settlement of Bosque County TR
40	Wilson Homesite	Wilson Homesite	July 22, 1983 (#83003127)	W of Clifton; 31°46′38″N 97°37′39″W	Clifton	Part of Norwegian Settlement of Bosque County TR

== Former listing ==
	Name on the Register	Image	Date listed	Date removed	Location	City or town	Description
1	Bosque County Jail		January 29, 1979 (#79002918)	August 18, 2014	203 E. Morgan; 31°55′24″N 97°39′21″W	Meridian	

== See also ==
- National Register of Historic Places listings in Texas
- Recorded Texas Historic Landmarks in Bosque County
