= Governor Olson =

Governor Olson may refer to:

- Allen I. Olson (born 1938), 28th Governor of North Dakota
- Culbert Olson (1876–1962), 29th Governor of California
- Floyd B. Olson (1891–1936), 22nd Governor of Minnesota
- Ole H. Olson (1872–1954), 18th Governor of North Dakota
