= Ingerval M. Olsen =

American judge

Ingerval M. Olsen, 1930

Ingerval M. Olsen (January 4, 1861 – June 26, 1943) was an American attorney and jurist who served on the Minnesota Supreme Court.

Ingerval M. Olsen was born in Lillehammer, Norway. Olsen emigrated with his parents to the United States in 1865 and settled in Nicollet County, Minnesota on a farm near St. Peter, Minnesota. Olsen received his bachelor's degree from the University of Minnesota in 1887 and was admitted to the Minnesota bar during 1893. Olsen practiced law in Sleepy Eye, Minnesota and became a Minnesota district court judge in 1906. He was re-eleeted in 1912 and was not a candidate in 1918. In 1920, was appointed to the district bench by Governor J. A. A. Burnquist. He was appointed associate justice of the Minnesota Supreme Court by Governor Theodore Christianson in 1930. Olsen served on the Minnesota Supreme Court until 1936. Olsen died suddenly in a hospital in Saint Paul, Minnesota.
