= Hans Peter Olsen House =

- U.S. National Register of Historic Places
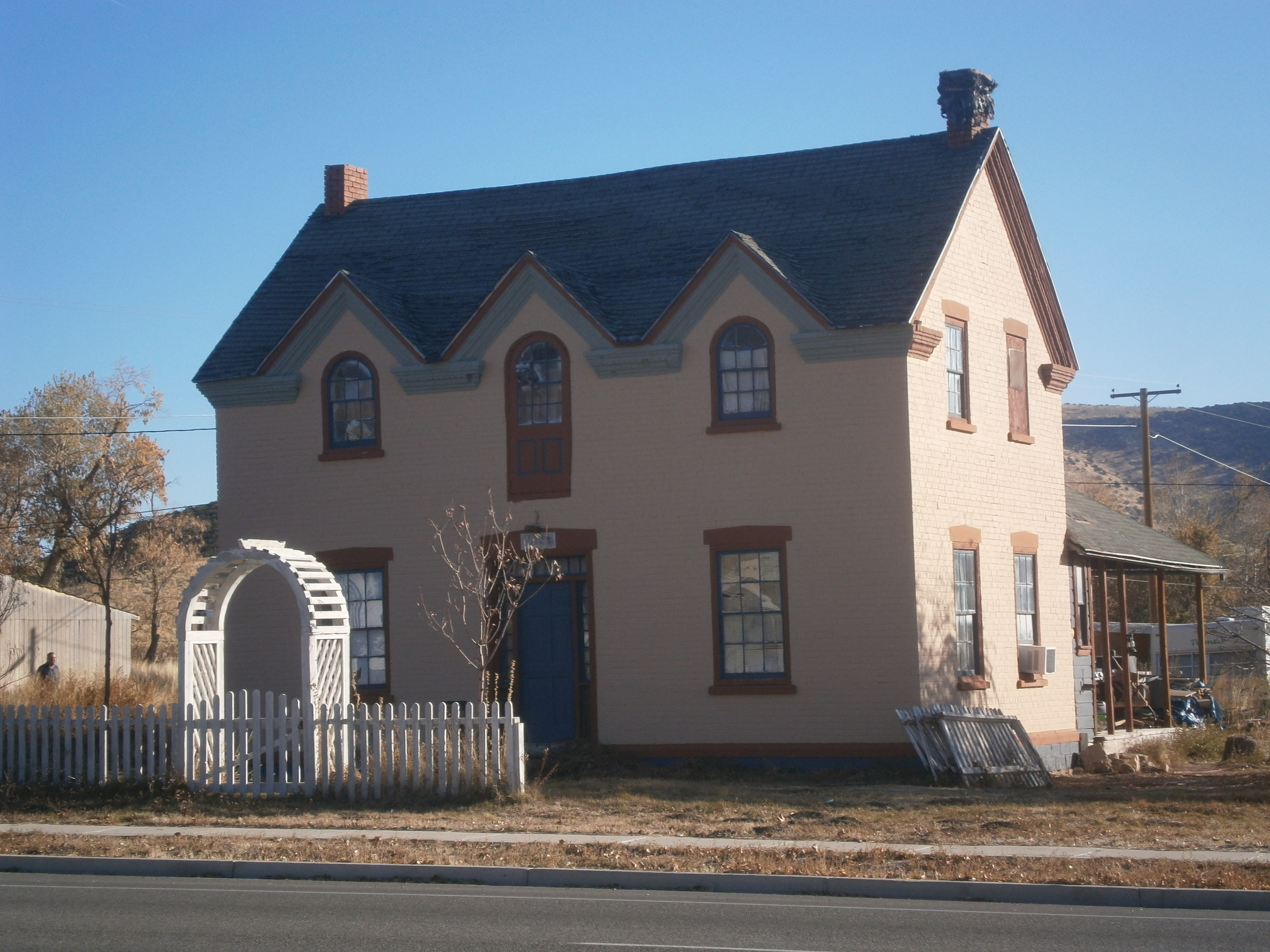

- Location within Utah
- Location: 211 S. State St., Fountain Green, Utah
- Coordinates: 39.625276°N 111.634125°W
- Area: 1.5 acres (0.61 ha)
- Built: 1877
- NRHP reference No.: 76001834
- Added to NRHP: April 22, 1976

The Hans Peter Olsen House, on Utah State Route 11 in Fountain Green, Utah, United States, was built in 1877. It was listed on the National Register of Historic Places in 1976.

Located at 211 S. State St., it is according to its National Register nomination "one of the finest pioneer brick homes in Sanpete County, an area noted mainly for its outstanding stone houses".

Also:

The Hans Peter Olsen home was constructed in 1877, nineteen years after Mr. Olsen came to Utah from Denmark. Born May 30, 1833 in Jutland, Denmark, Hans Peter Olsen grew up on his father's farm. In 1853 he joined the Mormon Church and spent the next four years as a traveling elder in his native country. In 1858 he sailed from Denmark on board the John Bright. Although the Utah War forced most of the European emigrants to remain at Iowa City and Florence, Nebraska, until the following year, a group of fourteen "Danish Fellows" of which Hans Peter was a member, was allowed to journey to Utah with a group of missionaries returning to Utah in the Eldredge company. In November 1858 he settled in Manti and the following spring moved to Moroni as one of the first settlers of that community. In 1867 he moved to Fountain Green and ten years later constructed the lovely brick home. He returned to Denmark on two missions for the LDS Church first in 1869 and again in 1891. While living in Fountain Green, he was a farmer and director of the local co-op store.
