= General Olson =

General Olson may refer to:

- Gregg P. Olson (fl. 1980s–2020s), U.S. Marine Corps major general
- John M. Olson (general) (fl. 1990s–2020s), U.S. Air Force brigadier general
- John T. Olson (1929–2011), U.S. Air Force brigadier general
- Sven-Olof Olson (1926–2021), Swedish Air Force lieutenant general

== See also ==
- Frederik-Valdemar Olsen (1877–1962), Belgian Congo Force Publique general
- Wilhelm Olssøn (1844–1915), Norwegian Army commanding general
