= Ishtakhaba =

Native American chief of the Sisseton Dakota tribe

- Ištáȟba
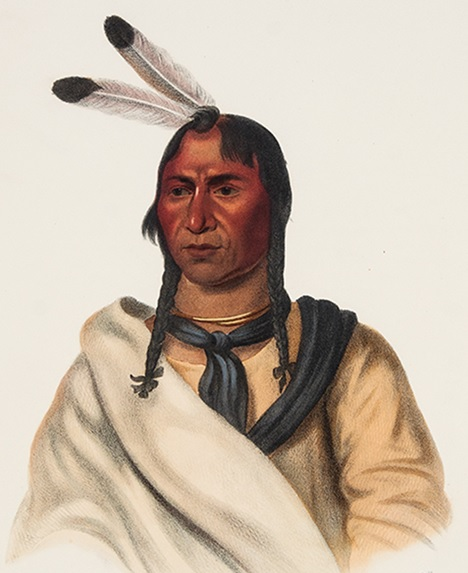
- As painted in 1824 by Charles Bird King

Sisseton Dakota leader

Personal details
- Born: c. 1780 Near Swan Lake, Ni County, Minnesota
- Died: 1859 Roberts County, South Dakota
- Resting place: Sleepy Eye, Minnesota
- Relations: Nephew, Sleepy Eye
- Children: One son, seven daughters
- Nickname(s): Chief Sleepy Eyes, Drooping Eyelids

Ishtakhaba (Dakota: Ištáȟba), also known as Chief Sleepy Eyes, was a Native American chief of the Sisseton Dakota tribe. He became chief sometime between 1822 and 1825, receiving a commission from the Bureau of Indian Affairs as chief in 1824, and remained chief until his death in 1860. His band, known as the Swan Lake or Little Rock Band, hunted "in southwestern Minnesota and southeastern Dakota ... between Swan Lake and Coteau des Prairies," until forced to move to reservation land near the Minnesota River in the wake of the 1857 Spirit Lake Massacre.

Ishtabkhaba tried to promote peace with whites in and around the state of Minnesota. He was a signer of at least four treaties with the United States government, including the Treaty of Traverse des Sioux, and met with President James Monroe in Washington, D.C. in 1824. Chief Sleepy Eyes was known for his friendships with "explorers, traders, missionaries and government officials". However, his nephew, who also bore the name "Sleepy Eyes," was involved in the 1862 Sioux Uprising.

== Legacy ==
According to Warren Upham, "Sleepy Eyes died in Roberts County, South Dakota, but many years after his death his remains were disinterred and relocated to Sleepy Eye, Minnesota, where they were buried under a monument erected by the citizens." The monument, close to the railway station, bears this inscription beneath the portrait of the chief in bas-relief sculpture: 'Ish-tak-ha-ba, Sleepy Eye, Always a Friend of the Whites. Died 1860.'"

In 1852, Sleepy Eye helped select the site which became today's Mankato, Minnesota. He advised traders not to build in low lying land near the Minnesota River, because it flooded, and suggested "the bluff" of Mankato's "present day Front Street" for a trading post instead.

A historical marker has been erected near the site which served as his main village between 1857 and 1859, at Sleepy Eye Lake "(then called Pretty Water By The Big Trees, Minnewashte Chanhatonka)."

His ceremonial pipe was returned to the city of Sleepy Eye by his "fourth great-granddaughter" in 2011.
