= Ralph O. Olson =

American judge (1902–1955)

The Honorable Ralph O. Olson

Justice of the Washington Supreme Court
- In office 1951 – 1955

Personal details
- Born: March 26, 1902 Alden, Minnesota
- Died: January 15, 1955 (aged 52) Olympia, Washington
- Education: Carleton College; University of Minnesota Law School
- Occupation: Judge

Ralph O. Olson (March 26, 1902 – January 15, 1955) was a justice of the Washington Supreme Court from 1951 until his death in 1955.

== Early life and education ==
Olson was born in Alden, Minnesota, and earned his bachelor's degree at Carleton College in Northfield, Minnesota, where he was a member of the Beta Theta Pi fraternity. He obtained his law degree at the University of Minnesota, where he played football.

== Career ==
After earning his law degree, Olson moved to the state of Washington and was admitted to the bar in 1924. He practiced as an attorney in Bellingham, Washington, until becoming a police judge in 1926. In 1936, he became a judge for the Washington State Superior Court. In 1951, he was appointed as a Washington Supreme Court justice after the retirement of Walter B. Beals and was formally elected as a justice in 1952.

== Personal life ==
He died from a cerebral hemorrhage at St. Peter Hospital on January 15, 1955, at the age of 52. Olson had a wife and several children. Following Olson's death, he was succeeded on the court by Richard B. Ott, who took Olson's son, Don Olson, as his law clerk.

Political offices
Preceded by Walter B. Beals	Justice of the Washington Supreme Court; 1951–1955	Succeeded by Richard B. Ott
