= Lars and Christina Olsen House =

Historic house in Orem, Utah, United States

- U.S. National Register of Historic Places
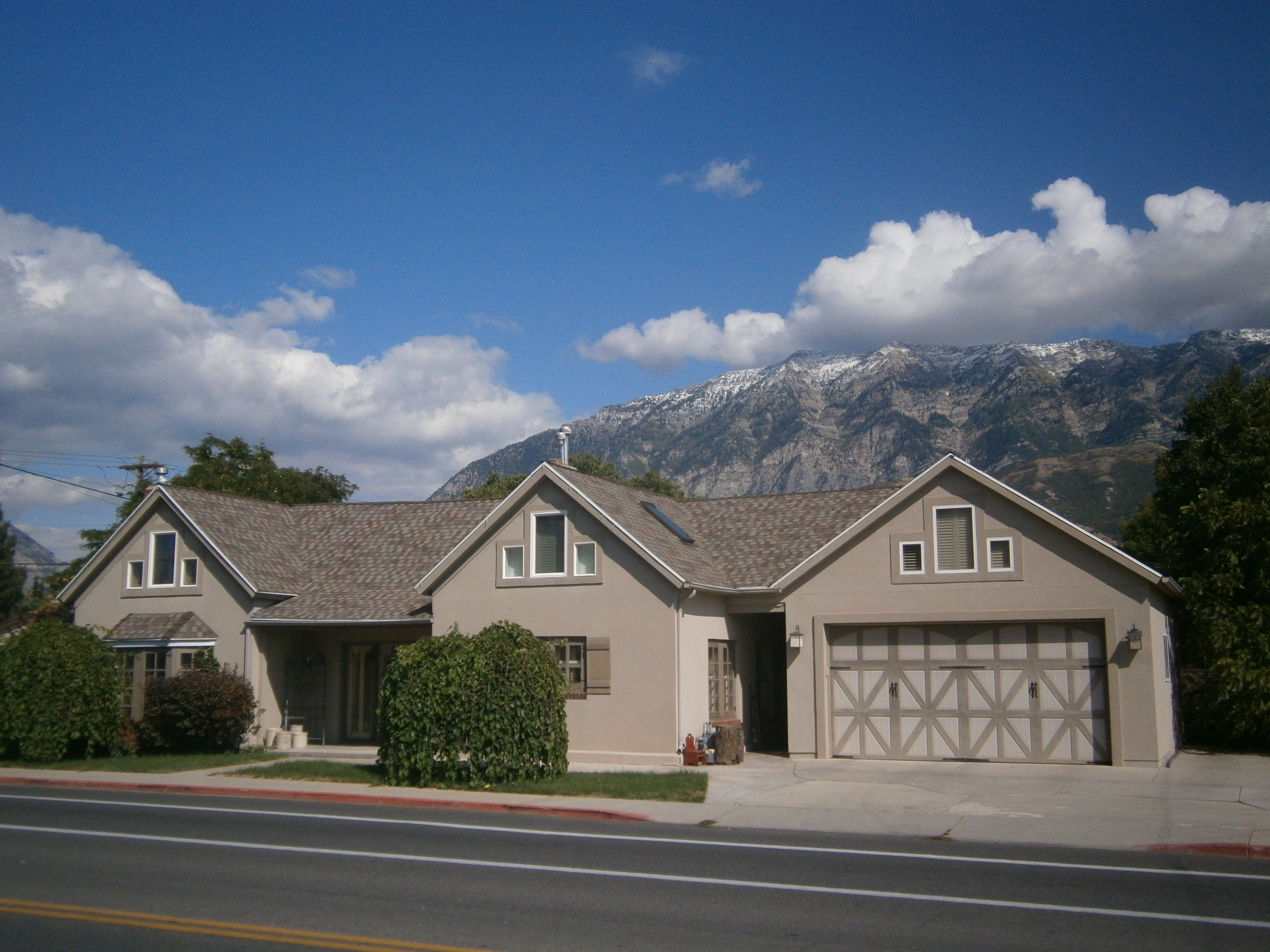
- Lars and Christina Olsen House, September 2019

- Location within Utah Location within the United States
- Location: 417 South 800 East; Orem, Utah; United States
- Coordinates: 40°17′22″N 111°40′50″W
- Area: 0.2 acres (0.081 ha)
- Built: 1885
- Built by: Olsen, Lars
- Architectural style: Classical Revival
- MPS: Orem, Utah MPS
- NRHP reference No.: 98000669
- Added to NRHP: June 11, 1998

The Lars and Christina Olsen House is a historic residence in southeastern Orem, Utah, United States, that is listed on the National Register of Historic Places (NRHP).

== Description ==
The hosese is located at 417 South 800 East and was built in 1885 by Lars Olsen. Son Otto reportedly trained boxer great Jack Dempsey at this house.

It was listed on the NRHP June 11, 1998.

== See also ==
- National Register of Historic Places listings in Utah County, Utah
