= Killing of Chad Oulson =

2014 incident in Wesley Chapel, Florida

- Date: January 13, 2014
- Venue: Grove 16 Theaters (Cobb Theatres)
- Location: Wesley Chapel, Florida
- Type: Shooting
- Motive: Self defense
- Target: Chad Oulson
- Outcome: Death of Chad Oulson and acquittal of Curtis Reeves

On 13 January 2014, retired American Special Weapons and Tactics commander Curtis J. Reeves Jr. shot and killed retired American Gulf War veteran Chad Oulson in the Grove 16 Theaters, a then-Cobb Theatres movie theater in Wesley Chapel, Florida, United States. The shooting occurred during pre-show movie trailers after intermission following a brief altercation between the two men. Reeves asked Oulson to turn off his cell phone and Oulson threw popcorn at Reeves.

In 2017, Reeves's legal team attempted to use Florida's stand-your-ground law as the basis of his defense, which was initially rejected by the court. In 2022, Reeves was acquitted of second-degree murder and aggravated battery.

== Death ==
On 13 January 2014, Chad Oulson and his wife Nicole Oulson were preparing to watch the movie Lone Survivor; retired law enforcement officer Curtis Reeves and his wife were watching from the row behind the Oulsons. Chad Oulson used his cell phone during the trailers; Reeves told Chad Oulson to turn off his cellphone and to not use it in the theater. Reeves then exited the theater to complain to theater personnel, then returned to his seat. Chad Oulson threw popcorn at Reeves, who drew a .380 caliber handgun and fired, shooting Nicole Oulson in the finger and fatally wounding Chad Oulson who died later the same day.

== Reactions ==
According to witness Alan Hamilton, an off-duty police officer, Reeves's wife said, "that was no cause to shoot anyone", to which Reeves scolded her with his finger and said, "you shut your fucking mouth and don't say another word". Reeves insisted that he killed Chad Oulson because he felt threatened by the younger, more physically fit individual. According to several sources, Reeves was also texting during the previews, responding to a text from his son.

== Trial ==
In 2017, a judge ruled that Reeves could not take shelter under the Florida's Stand Your Ground law, a decision that would later be overturned on appeal, leaving the determination of self-defense to the jury. Tampa defense attorney Richard Escobar referred to the case as "the largest self-defense case ever in Florida".

Eight years after the event, in February 2022, Reeves was acquitted of second-degree murder and aggravated battery. During the trial, Reeves stated that the confrontation made him more afraid than anything else in his life, including his SWAT experience and entire law enforcement career, but prosecutors disputed that statement. Officers on the scene described Reeves's demeanor as extremely calm.

== Post trial ==
In 2022, the Oulson Family Foundation was established to provide funds for children who have been affected by gun violence, including counseling, medical attention, and college tuition.
