= Nils Ohlsen =

German curator (born 1967)

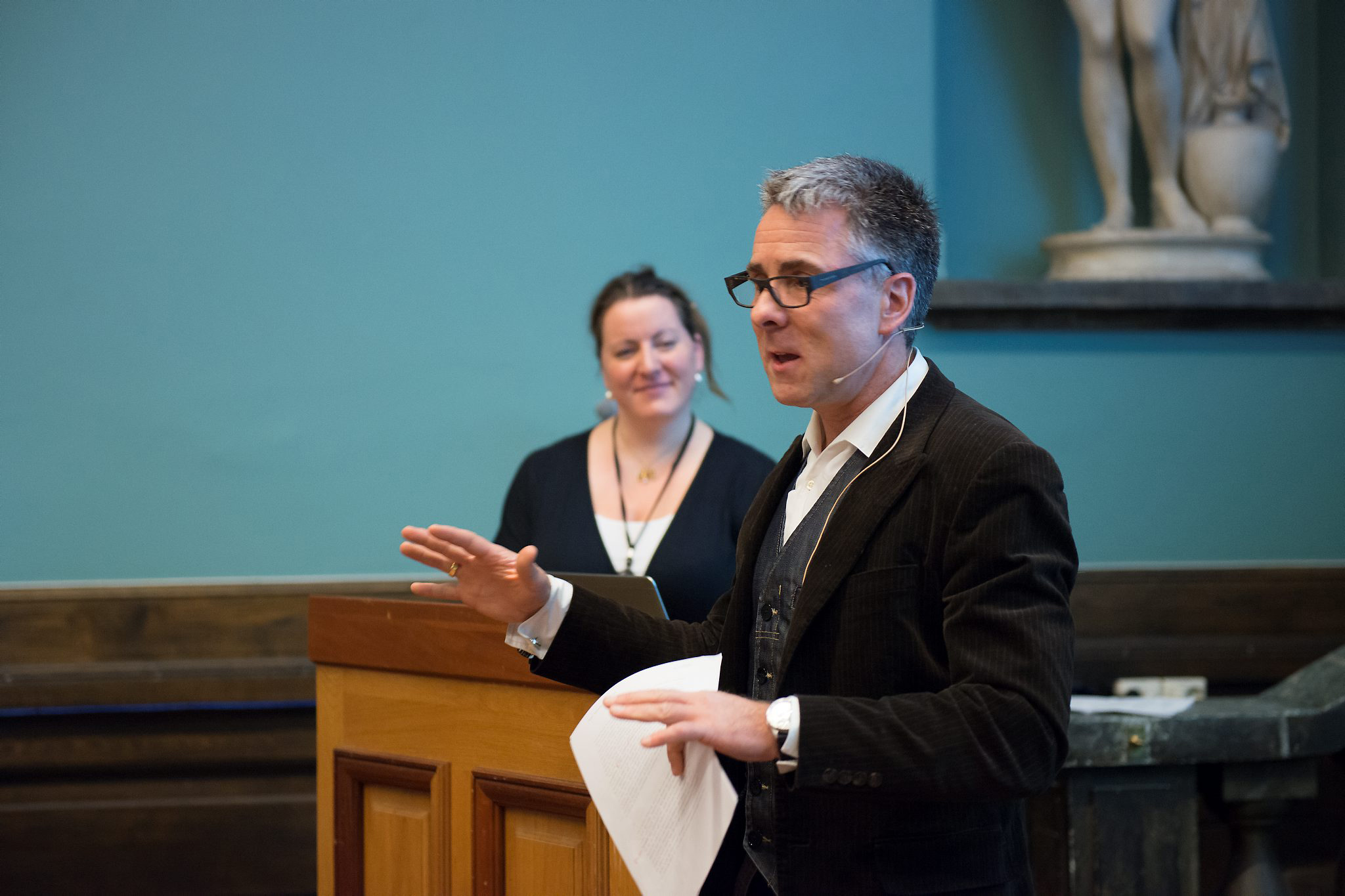
Ohlsen in 2015

Nils Ohlsen (born 1967 in Oldenburg, Germany), is director of the Lillehammer Art Museum since 2018. From 2010 to 2018 he worked as the director of old masters and modern art at the National Museum of Art, Architecture and Design in Oslo since 2010. Before that he worked as curator at the Kunsthalle Emden, from 2006 as scientific director. He studied art history, classical archaeology and prehistory, as well as multimedia design, in Berlin and Stockholm, also working as an archaeologist in 1996/97. In 1993 he obtained a magister artium degree at the Freie Universität Berlin with a thesis on Max Beckmann, before completing his PhD in 1997 at the same university with a dissertation on Scandinavian interior painting in the late 19th and early 20th centuries.

He has organized and written essays for many exhibitions and publications on art from romanticism until today, including ones on The nude in 20th-century art (2002), Garden Eden. The garden in art since 1900 (2007), Realism, Adventure Reality (2010), Between Film and Art - Storyboards from Hitchcock to Spielberg (2011) and Edvard Munch 1863-1944 (2013, co-curator). He is considered among the leading Munch scholars.
