= Sleepy Eye, Minnesota =

City in Minnesota, United States

Sleepy Eye
- City
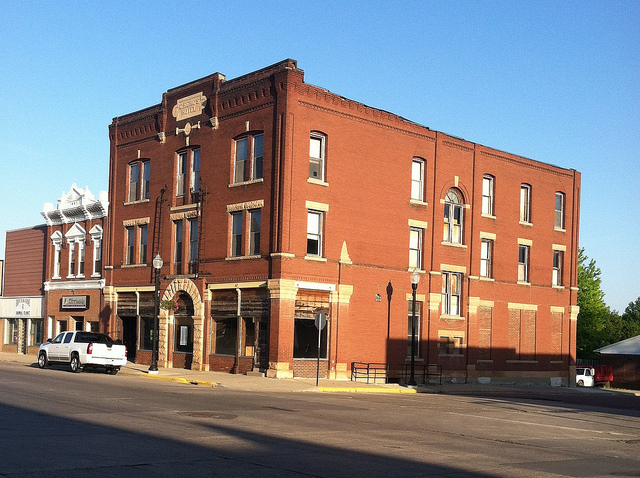
- 1899 Q. Berg Hotel (NRHP), 2012
- Nickname: The eye
- Location of Sleepy Eye, Minnesota
- Coordinates: 44°17′56″N 94°43′24″W
- Country: United States
- State: Minnesota
- County: Brown

Government
  - Type: Mayor – Council
  - Mayor: Joann Schmidt

Area
  - Total: 2.14 sq mi (5.54 km^{2})
  - Land: 1.87 sq mi (4.85 km^{2})
  - Water: 0.27 sq mi (0.69 km^{2})
- Elevation: 1,034 ft (315 m)

Population (2020)
  - Total: 3,452
  - Density: 1,845.0/sq mi (712.35/km^{2})
- Time zone: UTC-6 (Central (CST))
  - Summer (DST): UTC-5 (CDT)
- ZIP code: 56085
- Area code: 507
- FIPS code: 27-60844
- GNIS feature ID: 2395898
- Website: www.sleepyeye-mn.com

Sleepy Eye is a small city in rural Brown County, Minnesota, United States. The city is named after a famed local Dakota chief from the 1800s. The population was 3,452 at the 2020 census.

== History ==
Sleepy Eye took its name from Sleepy Eye Lake, which was named after Chief Sleepy Eye, who was known as a compassionate person with droopy eyelids (or maybe just one). The chief was one of four Sioux Native Americans (four Ojibwe also attended) chosen to meet President James Monroe in 1824 in the nation's capital. Later, Sleepy Eye was an integral player in the 1851 signing of the Treaty of Traverse des Sioux, which gave all the land but a 10-mile swath on each side of the upper Minnesota River to the U.S. government. His recommendations to traders led to the successful settlement of Mankato, away from flood areas, and the chief eventually settled his people near the lake now known as Sleepy Eye Lake.

Sleepy Eye was platted in 1872 and incorporated as a city in 1903.

== Geography ==
According to the United States Census Bureau, the city has an area of 2.02 square miles (5.23 km^{2}), of which 1.75 square miles (4.53 km^{2}) is land and 0.27 square miles (0.70 km^{2}) is water.

== Demographics ==
Historical population
Census	Pop.	Note	%±
1880	997		—
1890	1,513		51.8%
1900	2,048		35.4%
1910	2,247		9.7%
1920	2,449		9.0%
1930	2,576		5.2%
1940	2,923		13.5%
1950	3,278		12.1%
1960	3,492		6.5%
1970	3,461		−0.9%
1980	3,581		3.5%
1990	3,694		3.2%
2000	3,515		−4.8%
2010	3,599		2.4%
2020	3,452		−4.1%
U.S. Decennial Census

=== 2020 census ===
As of the 2020 census, Sleepy Eye had a population of 3,452. The median age was 42.5 years. 23.8% of residents were under the age of 18 and 22.3% of residents were 65 years of age or older. For every 100 females there were 96.0 males, and for every 100 females age 18 and over there were 91.5 males age 18 and over.

0.0% of residents lived in urban areas, while 100.0% lived in rural areas.

There were 1,454 households in Sleepy Eye, of which 27.5% had children under the age of 18 living in them. Of all households, 46.7% were married-couple households, 19.1% were households with a male householder and no spouse or partner present, and 27.6% were households with a female householder and no spouse or partner present. About 34.2% of all households were made up of individuals and 17.3% had someone living alone who was 65 years of age or older.

There were 1,583 housing units, of which 8.1% were vacant. The homeowner vacancy rate was 2.3% and the rental vacancy rate was 14.8%.

Racial composition as of the 2020 census
Race	Number	Percent
White	2,990	86.6%
Black or African American	12	0.3%
American Indian and Alaska Native	7	0.2%
Asian	21	0.6%
Native Hawaiian and Other Pacific Islander	2	0.1%
Some other race	169	4.9%
Two or more races	251	7.3%
Hispanic or Latino (of any race)	491	14.2%

=== 2010 census ===
As of the census of 2010, there were 3,599 people, 1,475 households, and 931 families living in the city. The population density was 2,056.6 inhabitants per square mile (794.1/km^{2}). There were 1,605 housing units at an average density of 917.1 per square mile (354.1/km^{2}). The racial makeup of the city was 94.3% White, 0.1% Native American, 0.9% Asian, 4.1% from other races, and 0.7% from two or more races. Hispanic or Latino of any race were 13.0% of the population.

There were 1,475 households, of which 30.1% had children under the age of 18 living with them, 51.4% were married couples living together, 8.3% had a female householder with no husband present, 3.4% had a male householder with no wife present, and 36.9% were non-families. 33.4% of all households were made up of individuals, and 17.8% had someone living alone who was 65 years of age or older. The average household size was 2.36 and the average family size was 3.04.

The median age in the city was 42.2 years. 25.6% of residents were under the age of 18; 6.5% were between the ages of 18 and 24; 21.1% were from 25 to 44; 27.3% were from 45 to 64; and 19.4% were 65 years of age or older. The gender makeup of the city was 47.4% male and 52.6% female.

=== 2000 census ===
As of the census of 2000, there were 3,515 people, 1,479 households, and 942 families living in the city. The population density was 2,099.9 inhabitants per square mile (810.8/km^{2}). There were 1,591 housing units at an average density of 950.5 per square mile (367.0/km^{2}). The racial makeup of the city was 94.03% White, 0.23% African American, 0.06% Native American, 0.34% Asian, 3.90% from other races, and 1.45% from two or more races. Hispanic or Latino of any race were 7.80% of the population.

There were 1,479 households, out of which 31.8% had children under the age of 18 living with them, 53.3% were married couples living together, 7.3% had a female householder with no husband present, and 36.3% were non-families. 34.5% of all households were made up of individuals, and 19.8% had someone living alone who was 65 years of age or older. The average household size was 2.37 and the average family size was 3.08.

In the city, the population was spread out, with 28.0% under the age of 18, 6.8% from 18 to 24, 26.0% from 25 to 44, 19.9% from 45 to 64, and 19.3% who were 65 years of age or older. The median age was 38 years. For every 100 females, there were 92.5 males. For every 100 females age 18 and over, there were 87.3 males.

The median income for a household in the city was $37,123, and the median income for a family was $48,500. Males had a median income of $31,612 versus $22,907 for females. The per capita income for the city was $20,175. About 4.7% of families and 8.1% of the population were below the poverty line, including 10.7% of those under age 18 and 10.2% of those age 65 or over.

== Pop culture ==
Residents of Sleepy Eye made national headlines in the early 1990s for trying to ban MTV in the town.

On the television series Little House on the Prairie, Charles Ingalls sometimes made deliveries to Sleepy Eye, which was portrayed as the nearest larger town to Walnut Grove, Minnesota, where the Ingallses resided. It was also the (fictional) home of the blind school that Mary Ingalls and her TV-husband, Adam Kendall, ran later in the series.

== Transportation ==
U.S. Route 14 and Minnesota State Highways 4, and 68 are three of the main arterial routes in the city.

== Notable people ==
- Vance Boelter, assassinated Minnesota state senator Melissa Hortman and her husband, wounded Minnesota state senator John Hoffman and his wife, was born and raised in Sleepy Eye.
- Helen Fischer, signer of the Alaska Constitution, was born in Sleepy Eye.
- Scott Jensen, Minnesota state senator, physician, and candidate in the 2022 Minnesota gubernatorial election, was born and raised in Sleepy Eye.
- Dana Kiecker, former Major League Baseball pitcher, was born in Sleepy Eye.
- Bernard F. Mathiowetz, Wisconsin legislator and lawyer, was born in Sleepy Eye.
- John Louis Nuelsen, former Methodist pastor, college and seminary professor, theologian, author, editor.
- Ingerval M. Olsen, Minnesota Supreme Court justice, practiced law in Sleepy Eye.
- Harvey N. Paulson, farmer and Minnesota state legislator, lived in Sleepy Eye.

== Gallery ==
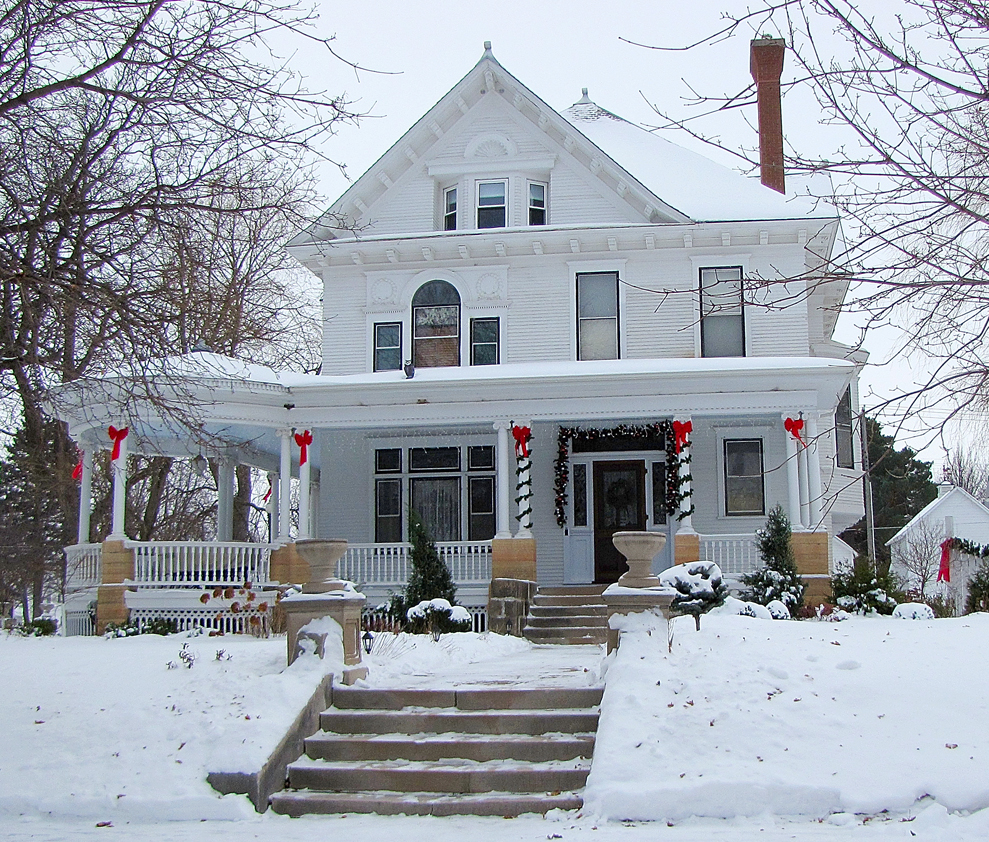
1901 W. W. Smith House (NRHP), 2010.

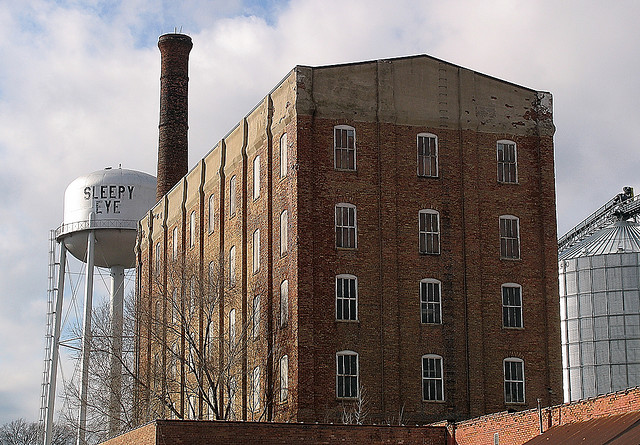
1901–20 Sleepy Eye Milling Company (NRHP), 2011.

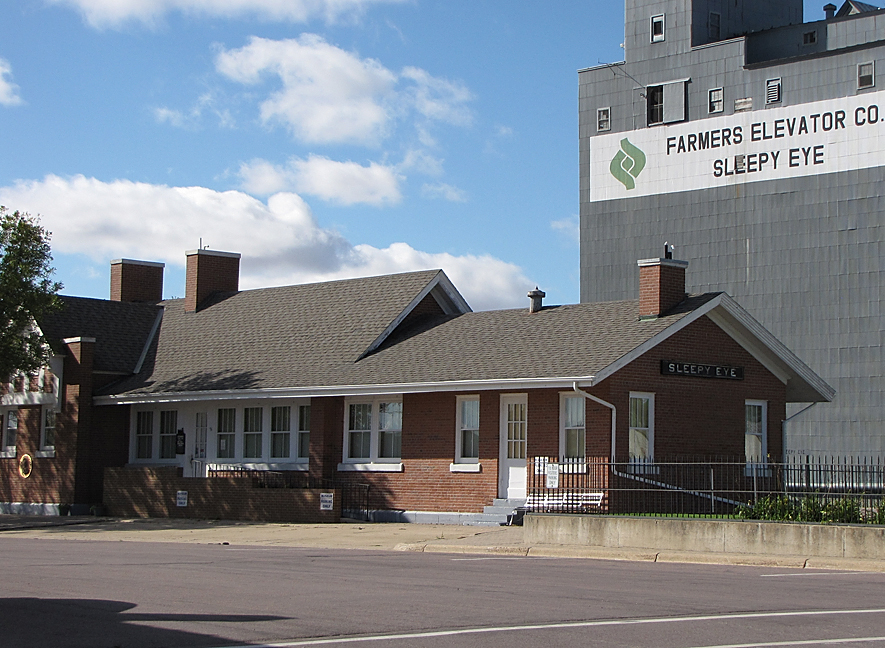
1902 Chicago and North Western Depot (NRHP), 2010.

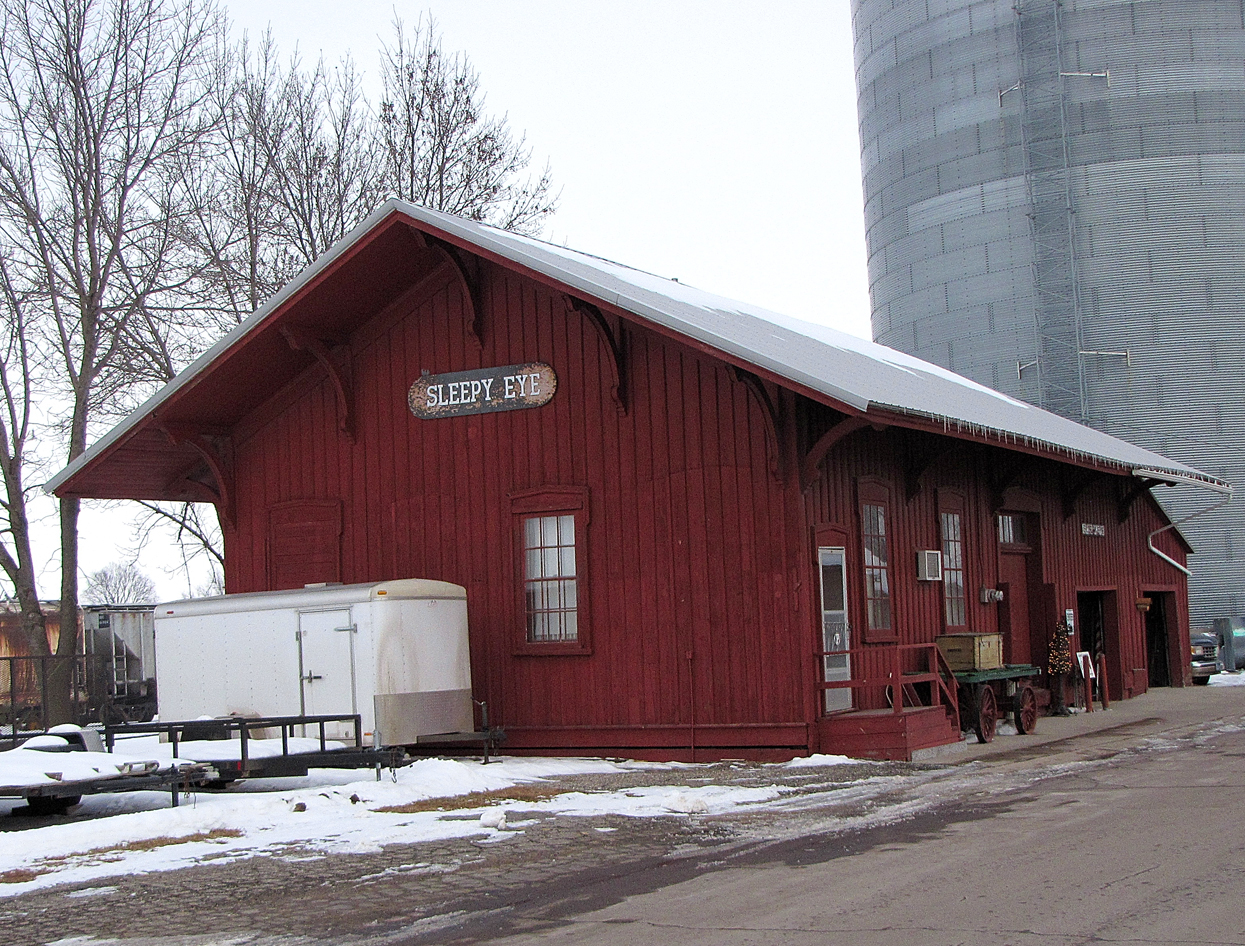
1887 Winona and St. Peter Freight Depot (NRHP), 2012.

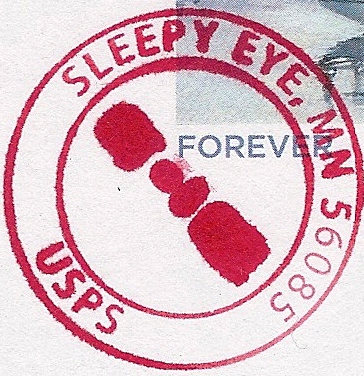
Postmark from City of Sleepy Eye

== See also ==
- National Register of Historic Places listings in Brown County, Minnesota
- St. Mary's High School (Sleepy Eye, Minnesota)
