= Magnus Olofsson =

Swedish engineer

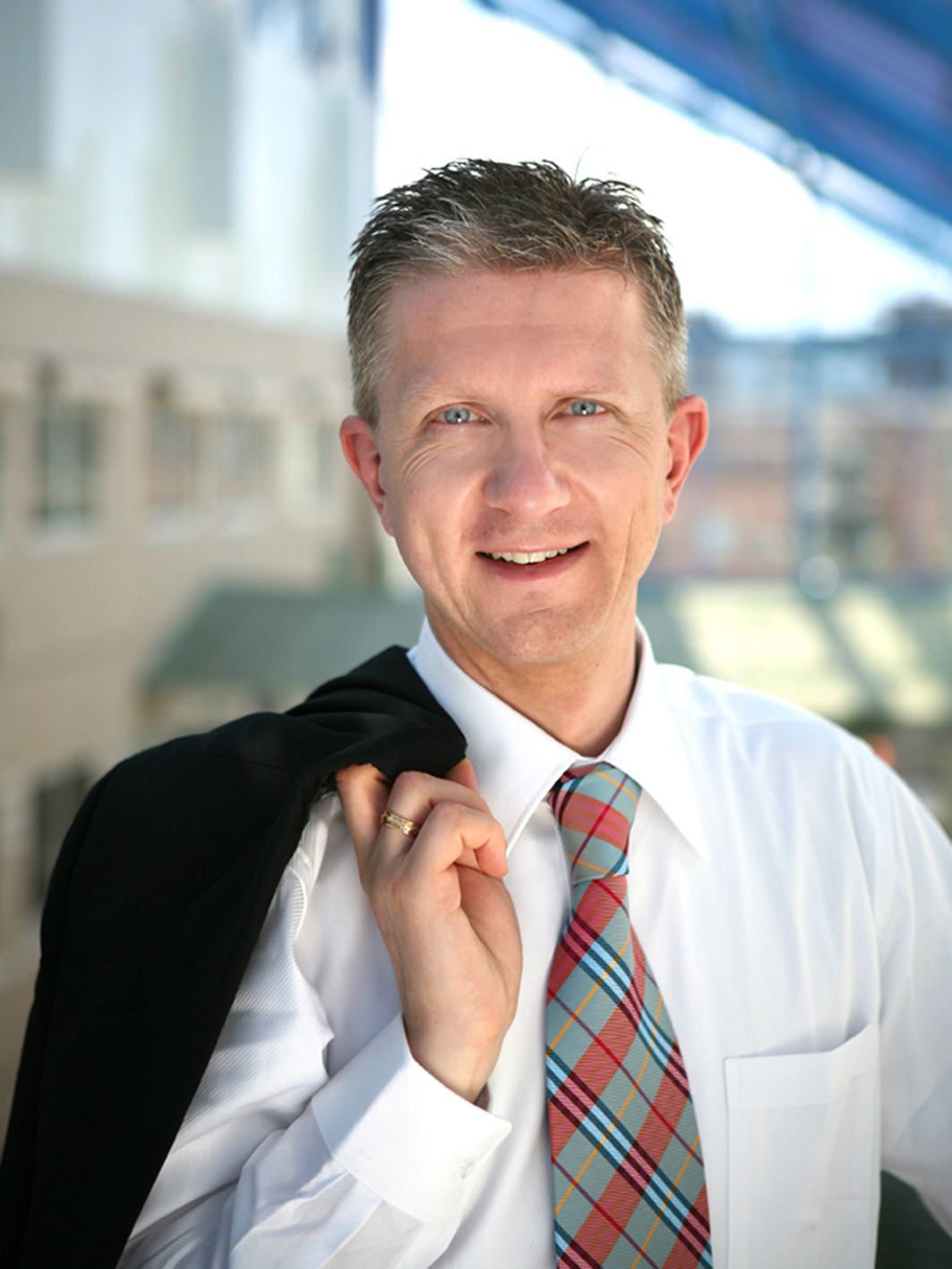
Portrait of Magnus Olofsson

Magnus Olofsson (born December 8, 1965), is a Swedish engineer and managing director at Elforsk AB. He was previously Director General and Head of the Electrical Safety Authority. Since March 2013, he has also been the President of Värmeforsk.

He holds a Ph.D. in electrical engineering from the Royal Institute of Technology (KTH) in Stockholm in 1996, where he also received his Master of Science degree in Electrical Engineering. In March 2013, he was elected member of the Royal Swedish Academy of Engineering Sciences.

Olofsson was employed by ABB in 2002-2008 where from 2003 he held a position as global product manager for circuit breakers in the business area of high voltage products at the headquarters in Zurich. In spring 2007, he moved from Ludvika to Beijing, where he was head of development in the region for high voltage products.

Olofsson was involved in the establishment of the Academic Research Centre High Voltage Valley in Ludvika as Director of Research and Director of Administration from 2004 to 2006 Between 1998 and 2002 he worked at STRI AB in Ludvika, including as director of research for the electric power system. Olofsson was a systems engineer and group manager at Banverket years 1996 - 1998.

Olofsson is a member of the Board of Ångpanneföreningen Research Foundation and member of the Strategic Council for the School of Electrical Engineering at KTH. Meanwhile, Director General and Head of the Electrical Safety Board was Olofsson Chairman of the Board of Electrical Board and vice chairman of SEK Swedish Elstandard.
