= Mack E. Jenkins =

American attorney and former federal prosecutor

Mack Eric Jenkins
- Education: B.A., University of California, Los Angeles (2000); J.D., Yale Law School (2003)
- Occupation: Attorney
- Years active: 2003–present
- Employer(s): Hecker Fink LLP (2025–present); U.S. Attorney’s Office, Central District of California (2008–2023); Gibson, Dunn & Crutcher LLP (2003–2008)
- Known for: Public corruption and civil rights prosecutions, RICO case against Crips gang
- Awards: EOUSA Director’s Award for Superior Performance by a Litigative Team (2019); Attorney General’s Award for Distinguished Service (2020); Anti-Defamation League's Sherwood Prize (2020); Federal Bar Association Peter Mazza Award (2021); Los Angeles County Bar Association Prosecutors of the Year Award (2025)

Mack Eric Jenkins is an American attorney and former federal prosecutor in the Central District of California, known for handling public corruption, civil rights, and gang-related cases. From 2008 to 2023, he served as an Assistant United States Attorney, including as Chief of the Public Corruption and Civil Rights Section from 2017 to 2023. Jenkins prosecuted notable cases, including a racketeering case against the Broadway Gangster Crips and public corruption cases involving former Los Angeles City Councilmember José Huizar and former U.S. Congressman Jeff Fortenberry, the latter of which was later reversed on appeal. In 2025, he joined Hecker Fink LLP as a partner, leading the firm's Los Angeles office. Jenkins has received several awards for his legal work, including the Attorney General's Award for Distinguished Service in 2020.

== Early life and education ==
Jenkins graduated from the University of California, Los Angeles (UCLA) in 2000, earning a Bachelor of Arts in political science and business administration. He then obtained his Juris Doctor from Yale Law School in 2003.

== Career ==
Following law school, he joined Gibson, Dunn & Crutcher LLP, where he focused on civil litigation.

=== Federal prosecutor ===
In 2008, Jenkins became an Assistant United States Attorney in the Central District of California under United States Attorney Thomas P. O'Brien. He also worked under André Birotte Jr., E. Martin Estrada, Eileen M. Decker, and Nicola T. Hanna.

==== Gang prosecutions ====
Jenkins supervised a Racketeer Influenced and Corrupt Organizations Act case against the Broadway Gangster Crips. In 2019, Jenkins, along with his team, received the Executive Office for United States Attorneys (EOUSA) Director's Award for Superior Performance by a Litigative Team for their successful prosecution of the 72-defendant Broadway Gangster Crips case.

==== Public corruption ====
During his tenure with the U.S. Attorney's Office, Jenkins held several positions. He served as Chief of the Public Corruption and Civil Rights Section from 2017 to 2023, leading investigations into corruption, civil rights violations, and hate crimes. He prosecuted Ron Calderon. Notably, he oversaw the prosecution of former Los Angeles City Councilmember José Huizar, resulting in the district's first federal racketeering conviction of a sitting elected official. He led the prosecution of former U.S. Congressman Jeff Fortenberry for campaign finance violations, marking one of the few federal convictions of a sitting member of Congress. Fortenberry's conviction was reversed by the United States Court of Appeals for the Ninth Circuit. He led the prosecution of Mark Ridley-Thomas. He was involved in the prosecution of Los Angeles Deputy Mayor Raymond Chan. He was involved in the prosecution of officials involved in corruption at the Los Angeles Department of Water and Power.

=== Private practice ===
In 2025, Jenkins joined Hecker Fink LLP as a partner, leading the firm's Los Angeles office.

== Awards and recognition ==
In 2020, Attorney General William Barr awarded him the Attorney General's Award for Distinguished Service. He was recognized by the Anti-Defamation League for combating hate crimes. In 2021, he received the Federal Bar Association's Peter Mazza Award. In 2025, he (along with other AUSAs) received the 2025 Prosecutors of the Year Award at the Los Angeles County Bar Association. He is a Fellow of the American College of Trial Lawyers. He has been recognized by publications.
