= Judge Sykes =

Judge Sykes may refer to:

- Bryan Sykes (judge) (fl. 2010s–2020s), Chief Justice of Jamaica
- Diane S. Sykes (born 1957), judge of the United States Court of Appeals for the Seventh Circuit and justice of the Wisconsin Supreme Court
- Sunshine Sykes (born 1974), judge of the United States District Court for the Central District of California
