= Judge Blumenfeld =

Judge Blumenfeld may refer to:

- Mosher Joseph Blumenfeld (1904–1988), judge of the United States District Court for the District of Connecticut
- Stanley Blumenfeld (born 1962), judge of the United States District Court for the Central District of California
