= Judge Kenyon =

Judge Kenyon may refer to:

- David Vreeland Kenyon (1930–2015), judge of the United States District Court for the Central District of California
- Dorothy Kenyon (1888–1972), American lawyer, judge, and political activist
- William S. Kenyon (Iowa politician) (1869–1933), judge of the United States Court of Appeals for the Eighth Circuit
