= Kenly Kiya Kato =

American judge (born 1972)

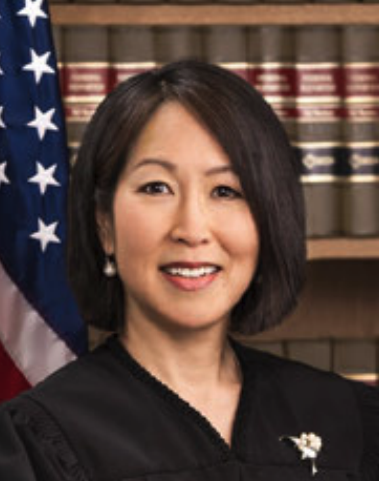

Judge of the United States District Court for the Central District of California
- Incumbent
- Assumed office November 17, 2023
- Appointed by: Joe Biden
- Preceded by: Beverly Reid O'Connell

Magistrate Judge of the United States District Court for the Central District of California
- In office July 1, 2014 – November 17, 2023
- Succeeded by: David T. Bristow

Personal details
- Born: 1972 (age 53–54) Los Angeles, California, U.S.
- Education: University of California, Los Angeles (BA); Harvard University (JD)

Kenly Kiya Kato (born 1972) is an American judge who has served as a United States district judge of the United States District Court for the Central District of California since 2023. She previously served as a United States magistrate judge of the same court from 2014 to 2023.

== Education ==
Kato is Japanese American; her parents, as children, were among those subjected to internment during World War II. She earned her Bachelor of Arts, summa cum laude, from the University of California, Los Angeles in 1993. She graduated Phi Beta Kappa, with a major in political science. She received a Juris Doctor, cum laude, in 1996 from Harvard Law School, where she was an editor of the Harvard Civil Rights–Civil Liberties Law Review.

== Career ==
Kato served as a law clerk for Judge Robert Mitsuhiro Takasugi of the United States District Court for the Central District of California from 1996 to 1997. From 1997 to 2003, she was a deputy federal public defender in the federal public defender's office in Los Angeles. From 2003 to 2004, Kato was an associate at Liner LLP in Los Angeles.

From 2004 to 2014, she was a sole practitioner. She primarily represented federal criminal defendants, and also represented clients in civil rights and labor disputes. Prior to her appointment as a U.S. magistrate judge, she served on the federal district court's Merit Selection Panel and Standing Committee on Attorney Discipline.

=== Federal judicial service ===
On July 1, 2014, Kato was sworn in as a United States magistrate judge for the U.S. District Court for the Central District of California.

On December 15, 2021, President Joe Biden nominated Kato to serve as a United States district judge of the United States District Court for the Central District of California. President Biden nominated Kato to the seat vacated by Judge Beverly Reid O'Connell, who died on October 8, 2017.

On February 1, 2022, a hearing was held before the Senate Judiciary Committee. During her confirmation hearing, Senators Chuck Grassley and Ted Cruz questioned her about a 1995 book review, published in Harvard Civil Rights–Civil Liberties Law Review, that Kato had co-written in law school; in a heated dialogue, the two Republicans questioned Kato about a footnote in the book review that said that Asian-American neoconservatives "internalize the dialogue of oppressors, believing in the values of the status quo and condemning the activism of their group." Cruz also questioned her about her views on affirmative action. Some Republicans also objected to Kato's past experience as a public defender. Her nomination is supported by the National Asian Pacific American Bar Association. On March 10, 2022, the committee failed to report her nomination by an 11–11 vote.

On January 3, 2023, her nomination was returned to the president under Rule XXXI, Paragraph 6 of the Senate; she was renominated the same day. On February 9, 2023, her nomination was reported out of committee by a party-line 11–10 vote. On November 7, 2023, the Senate invoked cloture on her nomination by a 50–47 vote. Later that day, her nomination was confirmed by a 51–46 vote. She received her judicial commission on November 17, 2023.

== See also ==
- List of Asian American jurists
- Joe Biden judicial appointment controversies

Legal offices
Preceded by Beverly Reid O'Connell	Judge of the United States District Court for the Central District of California; 2023–present	Incumbent
