= United States District Court for the Central District of California =

U.S. federal district court

- (C.D. Cal.)
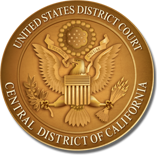

- Divisions of the Central District of California : Eastern (green), Southern (red), and Western (blue)
- Location: Edward R. Roybal Federal Building and U.S. Courthouse (Los Angeles) More locations: New United States Courthouse (Los Angeles); Ronald Reagan Federal Building and Courthouse (Santa Ana); Riverside / San Bernardino
- Appeals to: Ninth Circuit
- Established: September 18, 1966
- Judges: 28
- Chief Judge: Dolly Gee

Officers of the court
- U.S. Attorney: Vacant
- U.S. Marshal: David M. Singer
- www.cacd.uscourts.gov

The United States District Court for the Central District of California (in case citations, C.D. Cal.; commonly referred to as the CDCA or CACD) is a federal trial court that serves over 19 million people in Southern and Central California, making it the most populous federal judicial district. The district was created on September 18, 1966. Cases from the Central District are appealed to the United States Court of Appeals for the Ninth Circuit (except for patent claims and claims against the United States government under the Tucker Act, which are appealed to the Federal Circuit).

== History ==
California was admitted to the union on September 9, 1850, and was divided into two federal trial court districts – Northern and Southern – by Act of Congress on September 28, 1850, 9 Stat. 521. The boundary was at the 37th parallel. The two districts were merged as the United States District Court for the District of California on July 27, 1866, by 14 Stat. 300. On August 5, 1886, Congress re-created the Southern District by 24 Stat. 308, while the northern half was renamed Northern District. The Eastern and Central Districts of California were created on March 18, 1966, from portions of the Northern and Southern Districts by 80 Stat. 75.

Along with the Central District of Illinois, this court is the only district court referred to by the name "Central" – all other courts with similar geographical names instead use the term "Middle".

== Divisions ==
The U.S. District Court for the Central District of California is divided into three divisions, with jurisdiction over seven counties: Riverside, San Bernardino, Orange, Los Angeles, San Luis Obispo, Santa Barbara, and Ventura.

The Eastern Division covers Riverside and San Bernardino Counties at the Riverside courthouse.

The Southern Division covers Orange County from the Ronald Reagan Federal Building and Courthouse in Santa Ana.

The Western Division covers Los Angeles, San Luis Obispo, Santa Barbara, and Ventura Counties. Cases are heard in two courthouses in downtown Los Angeles. All but two district judges are located in the new First Street Courthouse, whereas magistrate judges and two district judges maintain chambers in the Edward R. Roybal Courthouse.

== United States attorney for the Central District of California ==
The United States attorney for the Central District of California represents the United States government in civil and criminal cases before the court. Beginning on April 2, 2025, the interim U.S. Attorney for the district was Bill Essayli. On October 28, 2025, a federal judge ruled that Essayli's authority as an interim appointee had expired as of July 29, 2025. Judge J. Michael Seabright wrote that "Essayli unlawfully assumed the role of Acting United States Attorney for the Central District of California", stating that "He is disqualified from serving in that role".

== Current judges ==
As of September 19, 2026:

#	Title	Judge	Duty station	Born	Term of service			Appointed by
#	Title	Judge	Duty station	Born	Active	Chief	Senior	Appointed by
76	Chief Judge	Dolly Gee	Los Angeles	1959	2010–present	2024–present	—	Obama
37	District Judge	Stephen Victor Wilson	Los Angeles	1941	1985–present	—	—	Reagan
56	District Judge	David O. Carter	Santa Ana	1944	1998–present	—	—	Clinton
61	District Judge	Percy Anderson	Los Angeles	1948	2002–present	—	—	G.W. Bush
62	District Judge	John F. Walter	Los Angeles	1944	2002–present	—	—	G.W. Bush
63	District Judge	R. Gary Klausner	Los Angeles	1941	2002–present	—	—	G.W. Bush
73	District Judge	Otis D. Wright II	Los Angeles	1944	2007–present	—	—	G.W. Bush
79	District Judge	Michael W. Fitzgerald	Los Angeles	1959	2012–present	—	—	Obama
80	District Judge	Jesus Bernal	Riverside	1963	2012–present	—	—	Obama
81	District Judge	Fernando M. Olguin	Los Angeles	1961	2013–present	—	—	Obama
83	District Judge	André Birotte Jr.	Los Angeles	1966	2014–present	—	—	Obama
84	District Judge	Stanley Blumenfeld	Los Angeles	1962	2020–present	—	—	Trump
85	District Judge	John W. Holcomb	Santa Ana	1963	2020–present	—	—	Trump
86	District Judge	Mark C. Scarsi	Los Angeles	1964	2020–present	—	—	Trump
87	District Judge	Fernando Aenlle-Rocha	Los Angeles	1961	2020–present	—	—	Trump
88	District Judge	Maame Frimpong	Los Angeles	1976	2022–present	—	—	Biden
89	District Judge	Fred W. Slaughter	Santa Ana	1973	2022–present	—	—	Biden
90	District Judge	Sunshine Sykes	Riverside	1974	2022–present	—	—	Biden
91	District Judge	Sherilyn Peace Garnett	Los Angeles	1969	2022–present	—	—	Biden
92	District Judge	Wesley Hsu	Los Angeles	1971	2023–present	—	—	Biden
93	District Judge	Hernán D. Vera	Los Angeles	1970	2023–present	—	—	Biden
94	District Judge	Kenly Kiya Kato	Riverside	1972	2023–present	—	—	Biden
95	District Judge	Mónica Ramírez Almadani	Santa Ana	1979	2023–present	—	—	Biden
96	District Judge	Michelle Williams Court	Los Angeles	1966	2024–present	—	—	Biden
97	District Judge	Anne Hwang	Los Angeles	1975	2024–present	—	—	Biden
98	District Judge	Cynthia Valenzuela Dixon	Los Angeles	1969	2024–present	—	—	Biden
99	District Judge	Serena Murillo	Los Angeles	1970	2025–present	—	—	Biden
100	District Judge	vacant	—	—	—	—	—	—
23	Senior Judge	Terry J. Hatter Jr.	Los Angeles	1933	1979–2005	1998–2001	2005–present	Carter
26	Senior Judge	Consuelo Bland Marshall	Los Angeles	1936	1980–2005	2001–2005	2005–present	Carter
52	Senior Judge	Christina A. Snyder	Los Angeles	1947	1997–2016	—	2016–present	Clinton
60	Senior Judge	Virginia A. Phillips	inactive	1957	1999–2022	2016–2020	2022–present	Clinton
65	Senior Judge	James V. Selna	Santa Ana	1945	2003–2020	—	2020–present	G.W. Bush
66	Senior Judge	Cormac J. Carney	inactive	1959	2003–2024	2020	2024–present	G.W. Bush
67	Senior Judge	Dale S. Fischer	Los Angeles	1951	2003–2024	—	2024–present	G.W. Bush
71	Senior Judge	Valerie Baker Fairbank	Los Angeles	1949	2007–2012	—	2012–present	G.W. Bush
74	Senior Judge	George H. Wu	Los Angeles	1950	2007–2023	—	2023–present	G.W. Bush
77	Senior Judge	Josephine Staton	Los Angeles	1961	2010–2026	—	2026–present	Obama
78	Senior Judge	John Kronstadt	Los Angeles	1951	2011–2022	—	2022–present	Obama

== Vacancies and pending nominations ==
Seat	Prior judge's duty station	Seat last held by	Vacancy reason	Date of vacancy	Nominee	Date of nomination
14	Los Angeles	Josephine Staton	Senior status	September 19, 2026	–	–

== Former judges ==
#	Judge	Born–died	Active service	Chief Judge	Senior status	Appointed by	Reason for termination
—	Leon Rene Yankwich	1888–1975	—	—	1966–1975 (Note: Reassigned from the Southern District of California.)	F. Roosevelt/Operation of law	death
—	William Matthew Byrne Sr.	1896–1974	—	—	1966–1974	Truman/Operation of law	death
1	Peirson Mitchell Hall	1894–1979	1966–1968	—	1968–1979	F. Roosevelt/Operation of law	death
2	Thurmond Clarke	1902–1971	1966–1970	1966–1970	1970–1971	Eisenhower/Operation of law	death
3	Albert Lee Stephens Jr.	1913–2001	1966–1979	1970–1979	1979–2001	Kennedy/Operation of law	death
4	Charles Hardy Carr	1903–1976	1966–1973	—	1973–1976	Kennedy/Operation of law	death
5	Jesse William Curtis Jr.	1905–2008	1966–1975	—	1975–1990	Kennedy/Operation of law	retirement
6	Elisha Avery Crary	1905–1978	1966–1975	—	1975–1978	Kennedy/Operation of law	death
7	Francis C. Whelan	1907–1991	1966–1978	—	1978–1991	L. Johnson/Operation of law	death
8	Irving Hill	1915–1998	1966–1980	1979–1980	1980–1998	L. Johnson/Operation of law	death
9	A. Andrew Hauk	1912–2004	1966–1982	1980–1982	1982–2004	L. Johnson/Operation of law	death
10	William Percival Gray	1912–1992	1966–1982	—	1982–1992	L. Johnson/Operation of law	death
11	Warren J. Ferguson	1920–2008	1966–1979	—	—	L. Johnson	elevation
12	Manuel Real	1924–2019	1966–2018	1982–1993	2018–2019	L. Johnson	death
13	Harry Pregerson	1923–2017	1967–1979	—	—	L. Johnson	elevation
14	David W. Williams	1910–2000	1969–1981	—	1981–2000	Nixon	death
15	Robert J. Kelleher	1913–2012	1970–1983	—	1983–2012	Nixon	death
16	William Matthew Byrne Jr.	1930–2006	1971–1998	1994–1998	1998–2006	Nixon	death
17	Malcolm Lucas	1927–2016	1971–1984	—	—	Nixon	resignation
18	Lawrence Tupper Lydick	1916–1995	1971–1984	—	1984–1995	Nixon	death
19	Robert Firth	1918–1984	1974–1979	—	1979–1984	Nixon	death
20	Robert Mitsuhiro Takasugi	1930–2009	1976–1996	—	1996–2009	Ford	death
21	Laughlin Edward Waters Sr.	1914–2002	1976–1986	—	1986–2002	Ford	death
22	Mariana Pfaelzer	1926–2015	1978–1997	—	1997–2015	Carter	death
24	A. Wallace Tashima	1934–present	1980–1996	—	—	Carter	elevation
25	David Vreeland Kenyon	1930–2015	1980–1995	—	1995–1997	Carter	retirement
27	Cynthia Holcomb Hall	1929–2011	1981–1984	—	—	Reagan	elevation
28	Richard Arthur Gadbois Jr.	1932–1996	1982–1996	—	1996	Reagan	death
29	Edward Rafeedie	1929–2008	1982–1996	—	1996–2008	Reagan	death
30	Pamela Ann Rymer	1941–2011	1983–1989	—	—	Reagan	elevation
31	Harry Lindley Hupp	1929–2004	1984–1997	—	1997–2004	Reagan	death
32	Alicemarie Huber Stotler	1942–2014	1984–2009	2005–2009	2009–2014	Reagan	death
33	James M. Ideman	1931–present	1984–1998	—	1998	Reagan	retirement
34	William J. Rea	1920–2005	1984–1998	—	1998–2005	Reagan	death
35	William Duffy Keller	1934–2025	1984–1999	—	1999–2025	Reagan	death
36	Ferdinand Fernandez	1937–present	1985–1989	—	—	Reagan	elevation
38	John Spencer Letts	1934–2014	1985–2000	—	2000–2014	Reagan	death
39	Dickran Tevrizian	1940–present	1985–2005	—	2005–2007	Reagan	retirement
40	John Davies	1929–2020	1986–1998	—	—	Reagan	retirement
41	Ronald S. W. Lew	1941–2023	1987–2006	—	2006–2023	Reagan	death
42	Robert C. Bonner	1942–present	1989–1990	—	—	G.H.W. Bush	resignation
43	Gary L. Taylor	1938–present	1990–2004	—	2004–2005	G.H.W. Bush	retirement
44	Lourdes Baird	1935–present	1992–2004	—	2004–2005	G.H.W. Bush	retirement
45	Linda Hodge McLaughlin	1942–1999	1992–1999	—	—	G.H.W. Bush	death
46	Audrey B. Collins	1945–present	1994–2014	2009–2012	—	Clinton	retirement
47	Richard Paez	1947–present	1994–2000	—	—	Clinton	elevation
48	Robert Timlin	1932–2017	1994–2005	—	2005–2017	Clinton	death
49	George H. King	1951–present	1995–2017	2012–2016	—	Clinton	retirement
50	Kim McLane Wardlaw	1954–present	1995–1998	—	—	Clinton	elevation
51	Dean Pregerson	1951–present	1996–2016	—	2016–2025	Clinton	retirement
53	Carlos R. Moreno	1948–present	1998–2001	—	—	Clinton	resignation
54	Margaret M. Morrow	1950–present	1998–2015	—	2015–2016	Clinton	retirement
55	Howard Matz	1943–present	1998–2011	—	2011–2013	Clinton	retirement
57	Nora Margaret Manella	1951–present	1998–2006	—	—	Clinton	resignation
58	Gary Allen Feess	1948–present	1999–2014	—	2014–2015	Clinton	retirement
59	Florence-Marie Cooper	1940–2010	1999–2010	—	—	Clinton	death
64	S. James Otero	1951–present	2003–2018	—	2018–2020	G.W. Bush	retirement
68	George P. Schiavelli	1948–2019	2004–2008	—	—	G.W. Bush	resignation
69	Stephen G. Larson	1964–present	2006–2009	—	—	G.W. Bush	resignation
70	Andrew J. Guilford	1950–present	2006–2019	—	2019–2020	G.W. Bush	retirement
72	Philip S. Gutierrez	1959–present	2007–2024	2020–2024	—	G.W. Bush	retirement
75	Jacqueline Nguyen	1965–present	2009–2012	—	—	Obama	elevation
82	Beverly Reid O'Connell	1965–2017	2013–2017	—	—	Obama	death

== Chief judges ==
Chief judges have administrative responsibilities with respect to their district court. Unlike the Supreme Court, where one justice is specifically nominated to be chief, the office of chief judge rotates among the district court judges. To be chief, a judge must have been in active service on the court for at least one year, be under the age of 65, and have not previously served as chief judge.

A vacancy is filled by the judge highest in seniority among the group of qualified judges. The chief judge serves for a term of seven years, or until age 70, whichever occurs first. The age restrictions are waived if no members of the court would otherwise be qualified for the position.

When the office was created in 1948, the chief judge was the longest-serving judge who had not elected to retire, on what has since 1958 been known as senior status, or declined to serve as chief judge. After August 6, 1959, judges could not become or remain chief after turning 70 years old. The current rules have been in operation since October 1, 1982.

== Succession of seats ==
Seat 1
Seat reassigned from Southern District on September 18, 1966 by 80 Stat. 75
P. Hall	1966–1968
Williams	1969–1981
Rafeedie	1982–1996
Snyder	1997–2016
Frimpong	2022–present

Seat 2
Seat reassigned from Southern District on September 18, 1966 by 80 Stat. 75
Clarke	1966–1970
Lydick	1971–1984
Ideman	1984–1998
Feess	1999–2014
Birotte, Jr.	2014–present

Seat 3
Seat reassigned from Southern District on September 18, 1966 by 80 Stat. 75
Stephens, Jr.	1966–1979
Kenyon	1980–1995
Wardlaw	1995–1998
Anderson	2002–present

Seat 4
Seat reassigned from Southern District on September 18, 1966 by 80 Stat. 75
Carr	1966–1973
Firth	1974–1979
Marshall	1980–2005
Fairbank	2007–2012
O'Connell	2013–2017
Kato	2023–present

Seat 5
Seat reassigned from Southern District on September 18, 1966 by 80 Stat. 75
Curtis, Jr.	1966–1975
Waters, Sr.	1976–1986
Lew	1987–2006
Wu	2007–2023
Hwang	2024–present

Seat 6
Seat reassigned from Southern District on September 18, 1966 by 80 Stat. 75
Crary	1966–1975
Takasugi	1976–1996
Moreno	1998–2001
Carney	2003–2024
Murillo	2025–present

Seat 7
Seat reassigned from Southern District on September 18, 1966 by 80 Stat. 75
Whelan	1966–1978
Pfaelzer	1978–1997
Manella	1998–2006
Nguyen	2009–2012
Olguin	2013–present

Seat 8
Seat reassigned from Southern District on September 18, 1966 by 80 Stat. 75
Hill	1966–1980
Gadbois, Jr.	1982–1996
Morrow	1998–2015
Vera	2023–present

Seat 9
Seat reassigned from Southern District on September 18, 1966 by 80 Stat. 75
Hauk	1966–1982
Hupp	1984–1997
Matz	1998–2011
Fitzgerald	2012–present

Seat 10
Seat reassigned from Southern District on September 18, 1966 by 80 Stat. 75
Gray	1966–1982
Rymer	1983–1989
Bonner	1989–1990
Collins	1994–2014
Blumenfeld	2020–present

Seat 11
Seat established on September 18, 1966 by 80 Stat. 75
Ferguson	1966–1979
Tashima	1980–1996
D. Pregerson	1996–2016
Holcomb	2020–present

Seat 12
Seat established on September 18, 1966 by 80 Stat. 75
Real	1966–2018
Garnett	2022–present

Seat 13
Seat established on September 18, 1966 by 80 Stat. 75
H. Pregerson	1967–1979
C. Hall	1981–1984
Davies	1986–1998
Walter	2002–present

Seat 14
Seat established on June 2, 1970 by 84 Stat. 294
Kelleher	1970–1983
Stotler	1984–2009
Staton	2010–2026
vacant	2026–present

Seat 15
Seat established on June 2, 1970 by 84 Stat. 294
Byrne, Jr.	1971–1998
Phillips	1999–2022
Hsu	2023–present

Seat 16
Seat established on June 2, 1970 by 84 Stat. 294
Lucas	1971–1984
Rea	1984–1998
Carter	1998–present

Seat 17
Seat established on October 20, 1978 by 92 Stat. 1629
Hatter, Jr.	1979–2005
Gutierrez	2007–2024
Valenzuela Dixon	2024–present

Seat 18
Seat established on July 10, 1984 by 98 Stat. 333
Keller	1984–1999
Klausner	2002–present

Seat 19
Seat established on July 10, 1984 by 98 Stat. 333
Fernandez	1985–1989
Taylor	1990–2004
Wright II	2007–present

Seat 20
Seat established on July 10, 1984 by 98 Stat. 333
Wilson	1985–present

Seat 21
Seat established on July 10, 1984 by 98 Stat. 333
Letts	1985–2000
Selna	2003–2020
Sykes	2022–present

Seat 22
Seat established on July 10, 1984 by 98 Stat. 333
Tevrizian, Jr.	1985–2005
Guilford	2006–2019
Slaughter	2022–present

Seat 23
Seat established on December 1, 1990 by 104 Stat. 5089
Baird	1992–2004
Schiavelli	2004–2008
Gee	2010–present

Seat 24
Seat established on December 1, 1990 by 104 Stat. 5089
McLaughlin	1992–1999
Cooper	1999–2010
Kronstadt	2011–2022
Ramírez Almadani	2023–present

Seat 25
Seat established on December 1, 1990 by 104 Stat. 5089
Paez	1994–2000
Otero	2003–2018
Aenlle-Rocha	2020–present

Seat 26
Seat established on December 1, 1990 by 104 Stat. 5089
Timlin	1994–2005
Larson	2006–2009
Bernal	2012–present

Seat 27
Seat established on December 1, 1990 by 104 Stat. 5089
King	1995–2017
Scarsi	2020–present

Seat 28
Seat established on November 2, 2002 by 116 Stat. 1758 (temporary)
Fischer	2003–2024
Seat made permanent on December 23, 2024 by 138 Stat. 2693
Court	2024–present

== List of U.S. attorneys ==
- George J. Denis (1888–1889)
- Aurelus H. Hutton (1889–1890)
- Matthew T. Allen (1892–1893)
- George J. Denis (1893–1897)
- Frank P. Flint (1897–1901)
- Louis H. Valentine (1901–1905)
- Oscar Lawler (1905–1909)
- Albert Schoonover (1913–1917)
- J. Robert O’Conner (1917–1921)
- Joseph C. Burke (1921–1925)
- Samuel W. McNabb (1925–1933)
- John Rose Laying (1933)
- Peirson M. Hall (1933–1937)
- Ben Harrison (1937–1940)
- William Fleet Palmer (1940–1942)
- Leo V. Silverstein (1942–1943)
- Charles H. Carr (1943–1946)
- James M. Carter (1946–1949)
- Ernest A. Tolin (1949–1951)
- Walter Binns (1951–1953)
- Laughlin Edward Waters Sr. (1953–1961)
- Francis C. Whelan (1961–1964)
- Thomas R. Sheridan (1962–1964)
- Manuel L. Real (1964–1966)
- John K. Van de Kamp (1966–1967)
- William Matthew Byrne Jr. (1967–1970)
- Robert L. Meyer (1970–1972)
- William D. Keller (1972–1977)
- Robert L. Brosio (1977) (Acting)
- Andrea S. Ordin (1977–1981)
- Alexander H. Williams, III (1981) (Acting)
- Stephen S. Trott (1981–1983)
- Alexander H. Williams, III (1983–1984)
- Robert C. Bonner (1984–1989)
- Gary Allen Feess (1989)
- Robert L. Brosio (1989–1990)
- Lourdes Baird (1990–1992)
- Terree Bowers (1992–1994)
- Nora Margaret Manella (1994–1998)
- Alejandro Mayorkas (1998–2001)
- John S. Gordon (2001–2002)
- Debra Wong Yang (2002–2006)
- George S. Cardona (2006–2007)
- Thomas P. O'Brien (2007–2009)
- George S. Cardona (2009–2010) (Acting)
- André Birotte Jr. (2010–2014)
- Stephanie Yonekura (2014–2015) (Acting)
- Eileen M. Decker (2015–2017)
- Sandra R. Brown (2017–2018) (Acting)
- Nicola T. Hanna (2018–2021)
- Tracy L. Wilkison (2021–2022) (Acting)
- E. Martin Estrada (2022–2025)
- Joseph T. McNally (2025) (Acting)
- Bill Essayli (2025) (Acting, unlawfully)

== See also ==
- Courts of California
- List of current United States district judges
- List of United States federal courthouses in California
