= John Spencer Letts =

American judge (1934 – 2014)

Senior Judge of the United States District Court for the Central District of California
- In office December 19, 2000 – November 10, 2014

Judge of the United States District Court for the Central District of California
- In office December 17, 1985 – December 19, 2000
- Appointed by: Ronald Reagan
- Preceded by: Seat established by 98 Stat. 333
- Succeeded by: James V. Selna

Personal details
- Born: John Spencer Letts; December 19, 1934 St. Louis, Missouri, U.S.
- Died: November 10, 2014 (aged 79) Torrance, California, U.S.
- Education: Yale University (B.A.); Harvard Law School (LL.B.)

John Spencer Letts (December 19, 1934 – November 10, 2014) was a United States district judge of the United States District Court for the Central District of California.

== Education and career ==
John Spencer Letts was born in St. Louis, Missouri. Letts received a Bachelor of Arts degree from Yale University in 1956 and a Bachelor of Laws from Harvard Law School in 1960. He was a Reserve Captain in the United States Army from 1956 to 1965. He was in private practice in Houston, Texas from 1960 to 1966. He was a vice president and general counsel of Teledyne in Los Angeles, California from 1966 to 1973, and was in private practice in Los Angeles from 1973 to 1975 before returning to his previous positions with Teledyne from 1975 to 1978. He returned to private practice in Los Angeles from 1978 to 1985.

== Federal judicial service ==
On November 7, 1985, Letts was nominated by President Ronald Reagan to a new seat on the United States District Court for the Central District of California created by 98 Stat. 333. He was confirmed by the United States Senate on December 16, 1985, and received his commission on December 17, 1985. He assumed senior status on December 19, 2000. He died on November 10, 2014, in Torrance, California.

== Sources ==
- Central District of California Death Notice

Legal offices
| Preceded by Seat established by 98 Stat. 333 | Judge of the United States District Court for the Central District of California; 1985–2000 | Succeeded by James V. Selna |
