= David Vreeland Kenyon =

American judge

Senior Judge of the United States District Court for the Central District of California
- In office October 27, 1995 – July 31, 1997

Judge of the United States District Court for the Central District of California
- In office September 30, 1980 – October 27, 1995
- Appointed by: Jimmy Carter
- Preceded by: Albert Lee Stephens Jr.
- Succeeded by: Kim McLane Wardlaw

Personal details
- Born: David Vreeland Kenyon; September 10, 1930 San Marino, California, U.S.
- Died: March 31, 2015 (aged 84)
- Education: University of California, Berkeley (BA); USC Gould School of Law (JD)

David Vreeland Kenyon (September 10, 1930 – March 31, 2015) was a United States district judge of the United States District Court for the Central District of California.

== Education and career ==
Born in San Marino, California, Kenyon received a Bachelor of Arts degree from University of California, Berkeley in 1952. He received a Juris Doctor from the USC Gould School of Law in 1957. He was a United States Marine Corps Infantry Officer from 1953 to 1954. He was a law clerk for Judge Ernest Allen Tolin of the United States District Court for the Central District of California from 1957 to 1958. He was in private practice of law in Los Angeles, California from 1958 to 1959. He was house counsel for Metro-Goldwyn-Mayer from 1959 to 1960. He was house counsel for National Theatres and Television, Inc. from 1960 to 1961. He was in private practice of law in Los Angeles from 1961 to 1971. He was a judge of the Municipal Court of Los Angeles from 1971 to 1972. He was a judge of the Los Angeles County Superior Court from 1972 to 1980.

== Federal judicial service ==
Kenyon was nominated by President Jimmy Carter on June 20, 1980, to a seat on the United States District Court for the Central District of California vacated by Judge Albert Lee Stephens Jr. He was confirmed by the United States Senate on September 29, 1980, and received his commission on September 30, 1980. He assumed senior status on October 27, 1995. His service was terminated on July 31, 1997, due to his retirement.

== Notable case ==
One of the first cases over which Kenyon presided was a dispute over ownership of the Marvel Comics character, Howard the Duck. On August 29, 1980, after learning of Marvel's efforts to license Howard for use in film and broadcast media, creator Steve Gerber filed a copyright infringement lawsuit against Marvel corporate parent Cadence Industries and other parties, alleging that he was the sole owner of the character. This was one of the first highly publicized creator's rights cases in American comics, and attracted support from major industry figures. The lawsuit was settled on September 24, 1982, with Gerber acknowledging that his work on the character was done as work-for-hire and that Marvel parent Cadence Industries owned “all right, title and interest” to Howard the Duck and the Howard material he had produced. On November 5, 1982, Kenyon approved the motion and dismissed the case.

== Death ==
Kenyon died on March 31, 2015.

== Sources ==
Legal offices
| Preceded by Albert Lee Stephens Jr. | Judge of the United States District Court for the Central District of California; 1980–1995 | Succeeded by Kim McLane Wardlaw |
