= Audrey B. Collins =

American judge (born 1945)

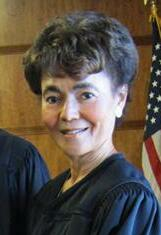
- Collins in 2012

Associate Justice of the California Second District Court of Appeal, Fourth Division
- Incumbent
- Assumed office August 1, 2014
- Appointed by: Jerry Brown
- Preceded by: Steven Suzukawa

Chief Judge of the United States District Court for the Central District of California
- In office 2009–2012
- Preceded by: Alicemarie Huber Stotler
- Succeeded by: George H. King

Judge of the United States District Court for the Central District of California
- In office May 9, 1994 – August 1, 2014
- Appointed by: Bill Clinton
- Preceded by: Robert C. Bonner
- Succeeded by: Stanley Blumenfeld

Personal details
- Born: Audrey Anne Brodie; June 12, 1945 (age 80) Chester, Pennsylvania, U.S.
- Spouse: Timothy R. Collins
- Education: Howard University (BA); American University (MA); UCLA School of Law (JD)

Audrey Brodie Collins (born June 12, 1945) is an American lawyer who has served as an associate justice of the Second District Court of Appeal for the State of California since 2014. She previously served as a United States district judge of the United States District Court for the Central District of California from 1994 to 2014.

== Education and career ==
Born in Chester, Pennsylvania, Collins received a Bachelor of Arts degree from Howard University in 1967, a Master of Arts from American University in 1969, and a Juris Doctor from the University of California, Los Angeles, School of Law in 1977.

=== Teaching career ===
Audrey taught at Dunbar High School in Washington, D.C. from January to June 1969. She was a substitute teacher for the Vigo County School District in Indiana from September 1969 to June 1970. She served as the Assistant Director of the Manual High School-University of Northern Colorado Model Cities Project in Denver from September 1970 to September 1971. She was a substitute teacher for John Adams Junior High School (now John Adams Middle School) which is part of the Los Angeles Unified School District in California from May to June 1972. She served as the Director of the Norman Topping Student Aid Fund from September 1972 to August 1974.

=== Law career ===
She was Assistant Attorney of the Legal Aid Foundation of Los Angeles in 1977. She was a deputy district attorney of the Los Angeles County District Attorney's Office from 1978 to 1994, including stints as Head Deputy of the Torrance Branch Office from 1987 to 1988 and Assistant Director of the Bureaus of Central and Special Operations from 1988 to 1992. She was Assistant District Attorney from 1992 to 1994. She was a deputy general counsel, Office of the Special Advisor to the Los Angeles Police Department Board of Commissioners in 1992.

== Federal judicial service ==
On January 27, 1994, Collins was nominated by President Bill Clinton to a seat on the United States District Court for the Central District of California vacated by Robert C. Bonner. She was confirmed by the United States Senate on May 6, 1994, and received her commission on May 9, 1994. She served as Chief Judge from 2009 to 2012. She retired from the bench on August 1, 2014 and became a justice of the California Court of Appeal.

== Honors ==
In 2013, Collins was the co-recipient of Judge of the Year Award from the Loyola Law School Fidler Institute Award for Excellence and also the Meritorious Women Awardee from the Los Angeles NAACP Youth Council.

== See also ==
- List of African-American federal judges
- List of African-American jurists
- List of first women lawyers and judges in California

Legal offices
Preceded by Robert C. Bonner	Judge of the United States District Court for the Central District of California; 1994–2014	Succeeded by Stanley Blumenfeld
Preceded by Alicemarie Huber Stotler	Chief Judge of the United States District Court for the Central District of California; 2009–2012	Succeeded by George H. King
