= Dale S. Fischer =

American judge (born 1951)

Dale Susan Fischer
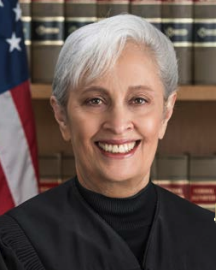

Senior Judge of the United States District Court for the Central District of California
- Incumbent
- Assumed office May 1, 2024

Judge of the United States District Court for the Central District of California
- In office November 5, 2003 – May 1, 2024
- Appointed by: George W. Bush
- Preceded by: Seat established by 116 Stat. 1758
- Succeeded by: Michelle Williams Court

Personal details
- Born: October 17, 1951 (age 75) Orange, New Jersey, U.S.
- Education: University of South Florida (BA); Harvard University (JD)

Dale Susan Fischer (born October 17, 1951) is a senior United States district judge of the United States District Court for the Central District of California.

== Early life and education ==
Fischer was born in Orange, New Jersey. She received her Bachelor of Arts degree from the University of South Florida in 1977, and her Juris Doctor from Harvard Law School in 1980.

== Private practice ==
Fischer was in private practice in California for 17 years, from 1980 to 1997, during which she also volunteer briefly for the Los Angeles City Attorney's Office. She practiced as a business litigator at the law firms Heller Ehrman and Kindel & Anderson.

== Judicial career ==
=== State judicial service ===
Fischer was a judge on the Los Angeles Municipal Court from 1997 to 2000, hearing criminal cases. She was then a judge on the Los Angeles County Superior Court, hearing criminal cases from 2000 to 2003.

=== Federal judicial service ===
On May 1, 2003, Fischer was nominated by President George W. Bush to a new seat on the United States District Court for the Central District of California created by 116 Stat. 1758. She was confirmed by the United States Senate on October 27, 2003, and received her commission on November 5, 2003. She assumed senior status on May 1, 2024.

==== Notable cases ====
In 2008, she oversaw the case of private investigator Anthony Pellicano. Fischer sentenced Pellicano to 15 years in prison for running an illegal wiretapping operation, wiretapping billionaire Kirk Kerkorian's former wife. The sentence significantly exceeded the five-year, 10-month term recommended by probation officials.

In 2018, Judge Fischer issued a nationwide injunction and receivership over West H&A-a company who had frauduently hijacked more than 2,000 defaulted mortgages nationwide and coinvinced the distressed borrowers to begin paying their mortgage payments to West H&A instead of their real lender. Nationstar Mortage LLC, represented by Jered Ede and Jane Kutepova, sought and obtained the first-of-its kind injunction and receivership after discovering several of its borrowers had begun paying West H&A thinking they had cured their defaults. West H&A was operated by Patrick Soria, who Fischer found in civil and criminal contempt after Nationstar demonstrated Soria had violated Judge Fischer's order. Soria was then prosecuted by the DOJ. In 2021, Soria was sentenced to more than 12 years in prison for orchestrating the fraud scheme causing more than $7 million in losses. Fischer said the scheme was "the most brazen and heartless" she had presided over in her career.

In 2023 the criminal securities fraud case of Terren Peizer, the CEO and chairman of publicly traded healthcare company Ontrak, was assigned to Fischer. After Peizer was charged with insider trading by the SEC, which alleged that he sold $20 million of Ontrak stock while he was in possession of material nonpublic negative information related to the company’s largest customer, the U.S. Department of Justice announced criminal charges of securities fraud against Peizer, charging that thereby he had avoided $12 million in losses. Peizer was convicted of insider trading and securities fraud, and could face up to 65 years in prison.

Legal offices
Preceded by Seat established by 116 Stat. 1758	Judge of the United States District Court for the Central District of California; 2003–2024	Succeeded by Michelle Williams Court
