= André Birotte Jr. =

American judge (born 1966)

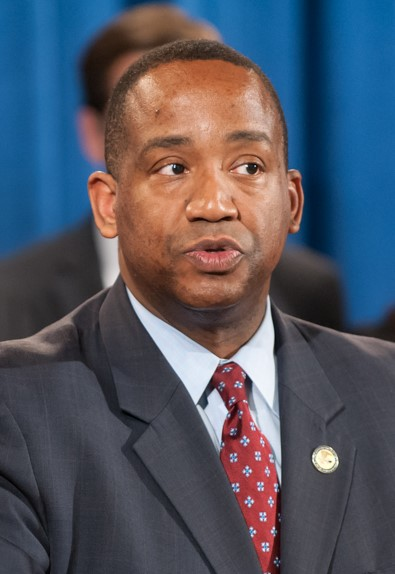

Judge of the United States District Court for the Central District of California
- Incumbent
- Assumed office August 8, 2014
- Appointed by: Barack Obama
- Preceded by: Gary Allen Feess

United States Attorney for the Central District of California
- In office March 4, 2010 – August 8, 2014
- Appointed by: Barack Obama
- Preceded by: Thomas P. O'Brien
- Succeeded by: Stephanie Yonekura

Personal details
- Born: August 15, 1966 (age 60) Newark, New Jersey, U.S.
- Education: Tufts University (BS); Pepperdine University (JD)

André Birotte Jr. (born August 15, 1966) is a United States district judge of the United States District Court for the Central District of California and previously served as United States Attorney for the Central District of California. On July 22, 2014, the United States Senate unanimously confirmed Birotte to serve as a district judge in Los Angeles after being nominated by President Barack Obama.

== Early life and education ==
Birotte was born in Newark, New Jersey, in 1966 to Haitian immigrants. Birotte graduated from Tufts University with a Bachelor of Science degree in psychology in 1987 and received his Juris Doctor from Pepperdine University School of Law in 1991.

== Career ==
After graduating from law school, Birotte was a deputy public defender in Los Angeles. In 1995, he became an assistant United States attorney. Four years later, he joined Quinn Emanuel Urquhart & Sullivan where he represented individuals charged with white collar crime.

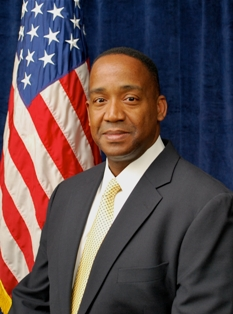
André Birotte as U.S. Attorney

Birotte was appointed to the United States Attorney's office by President Barack Obama and confirmed by the Senate in February 2010. He was sworn in on March 4, 2010. Judge Terry J. Hatter, Jr. administered the oath. Birotte was the first African-American United States attorney for the Central District. He supervised an office of 275 prosecutors.

=== Major cases ===
Birotte was the United States attorney investigating charges against former cyclist Lance Armstrong for defrauding of the government, drug trafficking, money laundering and conspiracy. He dismissed the case without comment on February 3, 2012. Armstrong reacted to the decision by stating "I am gratified to learn that the U.S. Attorney’s Office is closing its investigation. It is the right decision and I commend them for reaching it." The federal investigation had been ongoing for two years prior to its dismissal by Birotte. On February 5, 2013, Birotte stated that Armstrong's subsequent admission that he took drugs was no reason to reopen the original investigation.

=== Federal judicial service ===
On April 3, 2014, President Obama nominated Birotte to serve as a United States district judge of the United States District Court for the Central District of California, to the seat vacated by Gary Allen Feess, who assumed senior status on March 13, 2014. He received a hearing before the United States Senate Judiciary Committee on May 20, 2014. On June 19, 2014, his nomination was reported out of committee by a voice vote. On July 16, 2014, Senate Majority Leader Harry Reid filed a motion to invoke cloture on Birotte nomination. On July 22, 2014, the Senate invoked cloture on his nomination by a 56–43 vote. Later that day, Birotte was confirmed by a 100–0 vote. He received his judicial commission on August 8, 2014. He was sworn in the same day.

== Other activities ==
Birotte served as a judge pro tem for the Los Angeles Superior Court. He is a member of the Los Angeles County Bar Association's Judicial Appointments Committee and Criminal Justice Executive Committee. He has taught legal writing and advocacy at the University of Southern California Law School. Earlier in his career, he served as a deputy public defender in Los Angeles and as the inspector general of the Los Angeles Police Department. He served on the board of directors of the Langston Bar Association from 1992 to 2003.

== Personal ==
Birotte has a wife and three children.

== See also ==
- List of African-American federal judges
- List of African-American jurists

Legal offices
Preceded by Gary Allen Feess	Judge of the United States District Court for the Central District of California; 2014–present	Incumbent
