= Valerie Baker Fairbank =

American judge (born 1949)

Valerie Lynn Baker Fairbank
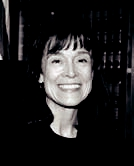

Senior Judge of the United States District Court for the Central District of California
- Incumbent
- Assumed office March 1, 2012

Judge of the United States District Court for the Central District of California
- In office February 16, 2007 – March 1, 2012
- Appointed by: George W. Bush
- Preceded by: Consuelo Bland Marshall
- Succeeded by: Beverly Reid O'Connell

Judge of the Los Angeles Superior Court
- In office 1987–2007
- Appointed by: George Deukmejian

Judge of the Los Angeles Municipal Court
- In office 1986–1987
- Appointed by: George Deukmejian

Personal details
- Born: Valerie Lynn Baker; June 25, 1949 (age 76) Minneapolis, Minnesota, U.S.
- Spouse: Robert H. Fairbank
- Education: University of California, Santa Barbara (BA, MA); UCLA School of Law (JD)

Valerie Lynn Baker Fairbank (born June 25, 1949) is a senior United States district judge of the United States District Court for the Central District of California.

== Early life and education ==
Born in Minneapolis, Minnesota, Fairbank received a Bachelor of Arts degree from the University of California, Santa Barbara in 1971, a Master of Arts from that institution in 1972, and a Juris Doctor from the University of California, Los Angeles School of Law, in 1975.

== Career ==
After being admitted to the State Bar of California in 1975, Fairbank entered private practice as an associate at the firm Overton, Lyman & Prince until 1977. From 1977 to 1980, she was an Assistant United States Attorney in the Criminal Division of the United States Attorney's Office for the Central District of California. She re-entered private practice as an associate for two years and a partner for four years at the firm Lillick, McHose & Charles from 1980 to 1986.

== Judicial service ==
From 1986 to 1987, Fairbank served as a judge for the Los Angeles Municipal Court, and from 1987 until her appointment to the federal bench in 2007, she served as a judge for the Superior Court of California, County of Los Angeles.

On January 9, 2007, Fairbank was nominated by President George W. Bush to a seat on the United States District Court for the Central District of California vacated by Consuelo Bland Marshall. Fairbank was confirmed by the United States Senate on February 1, 2007, and received her commission on February 16, 2007. She took senior status on March 1, 2012, due to a certified disability.

Legal offices
Preceded by Consuelo Bland Marshall	Judge of the United States District Court for the Central District of California; 2007–2012	Succeeded by Beverly Reid O'Connell
