= Cynthia Valenzuela Dixon =

American judge (born 1969)

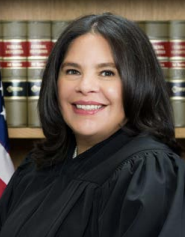

Judge of the United States District Court for the Central District of California
- Incumbent
- Assumed office December 16, 2024
- Appointed by: Joe Biden
- Preceded by: Philip S. Gutierrez

Personal details
- Born: Cynthia Ann Valenzuela; 1969 (age 56–57) Tucson, Arizona, U.S.
- Education: University of Arizona (BA); University of California, Los Angeles (JD)

Cynthia Valenzuela Dixon (née Valenzuela; born 1969) is an American lawyer who has served as a United States district judge of the United States District Court for the Central District of California since 2024. She previously served as a judge of the State Bar Court of California from 2016 to 2024.

== Education ==
Valenzuela Dixon earned a Bachelor of Arts from the University of Arizona in 1991 and a Juris Doctor from the UCLA School of Law in 1995.

== Career ==
From 1995 to 1998, she was a special assistant at the United States Commission on Civil Rights in Los Angeles; from 1998 to 2000, she was a trial attorney in the U.S. Department of Justice's Civil Rights Division in Washington, D.C.; from 2000 to 2006, she served as an assistant U.S. attorney in the U.S. Attorney's Office for the Central District of California. From 2006 to 2011, she was the head of national litigation at the Mexican American Legal Defense and Educational Fund in Los Angeles; from 2011 to 2016, she worked as the Criminal Justice Act Supervising Attorney for the Central District of California in Los Angeles. From 2016 to 2024, she served as a judge of the California State Bar Court in Los Angeles since her appointment by the California Supreme Court.

=== Federal judicial service ===
On April 24, 2024, President Joe Biden announced his intent to nominate Valenzuela Dixon to serve as a United States district judge of the United States District Court for the Central District of California. On April 30, 2024, her nomination was sent to the Senate. President Biden nominated Valenzuela Dixon to the seat vacated by Judge Philip S. Gutierrez, who subsequently retired on October 22, 2024. On May 22, 2024, a hearing on her nomination was held before the Senate Judiciary Committee. On July 11, 2024, her nomination was reported out of committee by an 11–10 vote. On November 20, 2024, the United States Senate invoked cloture on her nomination by a 50–49 vote. On December 10, 2024, her nomination was confirmed by a 49–47 vote. She received her judicial commission on December 16, 2024.

In September 2026, Valenzuela dismissed a Department of Justice lawsuit challenging policies allowing for the participation of transgender athletes in California schools.

== See also ==
- List of Hispanic and Latino American jurists

Legal offices
| Preceded by Philip S. Gutierrez | Judge of the United States District Court for the Central District of California; 2024–present | Incumbent |
