= Mónica Ramírez Almadani =

American judge (born 1979)

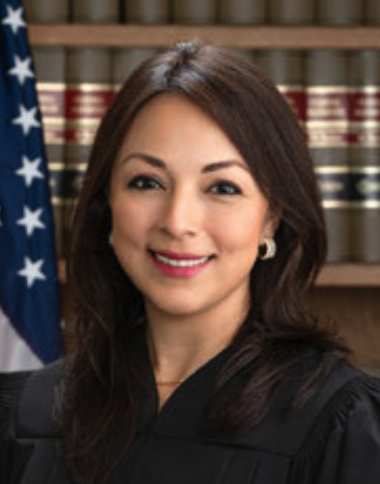
- Almadani in 2024

Judge of the United States District Court for the Central District of California
- Incumbent
- Assumed office November 21, 2023
- Appointed by: Joe Biden
- Preceded by: John Kronstadt

Personal details
- Born: Mónica Marie Ramírez; 1979 (age 46–47) Los Angeles, California, U.S.
- Party: Democratic
- Education: Harvard University (BA); Stanford University (JD)

Mónica Ramírez Almadani (born 1979) is an American lawyer who is serving as a United States district judge of the United States District Court for the Central District of California since 2023. She was the president and CEO of Public Counsel, a pro bono law firm, from 2021 to 2023.

== Early life and education ==
Mónica Ramírez Almadani was raised in Huntington Park, California, by parents who were immigrants from Mexico. She graduated from Harvard University in 2001 with a Bachelor of Arts, magna cum laude. She received a Juris Doctor from Stanford Law School in 2004.

== Career ==
From 2004 to 2005, Ramírez served as a law clerk for Judge Warren J. Ferguson of the United States Court of Appeals for the Ninth Circuit. From 2005 to 2009, she worked as staff attorney at the ACLU Immigrants' Rights Project in San Francisco.

In 2009, Ramírez joined the United States Department of Justice, serving as counsel to then-Assistant Secretary Tom Perez. She later served as senior counsel and deputy chief of staff for Deputy Attorney General James M. Cole.

From 2012 to 2015, she served as an assistant United States attorney for the Central District of California. From 2015 to 2017, Ramírez served as special assistant attorney general in the California Department of Justice and Senior Advisor to then-California Attorney General Kamala Harris. From 2017 to 2019, she worked as special counsel at Covington & Burling in their San Francisco office. From 2019 to 2021, Ramírez was a visiting professor of law at the University of California, Irvine School of Law and co-director of its Immigrant Rights Clinic.

In 2021, Ramírez became president of the nonprofit Public Counsel, a pro bono law firm, and left in 2023 to become a federal judge.

=== Notable cases as lawyer ===
- In 2017, Ramírez represented Juan Manuel Montes, then a 23-year-old illegal immigrant deported to Mexico despite being granted relief from deportation under the Deferred Action for Childhood Arrivals program or DACA.
- In 2018, Ramírez represented the California state legislature as amicus curiae in a Chicago suit challenging Attorney General Jeff Sessions' conditioning of grants to the end of sanctuary city policies.
- In 2020, Ramírez represented Kelvin Hernandez Roman, an El Salvadoran and Garden Grove, California resident who sued the Orange County Sheriff's Department for failing to comply with California sanctuary laws. Although charged with no crime, the Orange County Sheriff's Office turned him over to U.S. Immigration and Customs Enforcement, and he was held for nine months in ICE's Adelanto Detention Center. Roman's suit alleged that the county violated California Values Act.

=== Federal judicial service ===
On December 21, 2022, President Joe Biden announced his intent to nominate Ramírez to serve as a United States district judge of the U.S. District Court for the Central District of California. On January 23, 2023, her nomination was sent to the Senate. President Biden nominated her to the seat vacated by Judge John Kronstadt, who assumed senior status on April 1, 2022. On February 15, 2023, a hearing on her nomination was held before the Senate Judiciary Committee. On April 20, 2023, her nomination was reported out of committee by a 12–9 vote. On November 8, 2023, the United States Senate invoked cloture on her nomination by a 52–46 vote. On November 9, 2023, her nomination was confirmed by a 51–44 vote. She received her judicial commission on November 21, 2023.

== See also ==
- List of Hispanic and Latino American jurists

Legal offices
Preceded by John Kronstadt	Judge of the United States District Court for the Central District of California; 2023–present	Incumbent
