= Lourdes Baird =

American judge (born 1935)

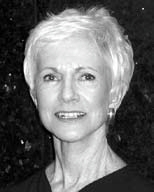

Senior Judge of the United States District Court for the Central District of California
- In office May 12, 2004 – April 15, 2005

Judge of the United States District Court for the Central District of California
- In office August 12, 1992 – May 12, 2004
- Appointed by: George H. W. Bush
- Preceded by: Seat established by 104 Stat. 5089
- Succeeded by: George P. Schiavelli

United States Attorney for the Central District of California
- In office July 20, 1990 – September 8, 1992
- Appointed by: George H. W. Bush
- Preceded by: Robert L. Brosio
- Succeeded by: Terree Bowers

Judge of the Superior Court of Los Angeles County
- In office 1988–1990

Judge of the Los Angeles Municipal Court
- In office 1987–1988

Judge of the East Los Angeles Municipal Court
- In office 1986–1987

Personal details
- Born: Mary Lourdes Gillespie; May 12, 1935 (age 91) Quito, Ecuador
- Education: Los Angeles City College (AA); University of California, Los Angeles (BA, JD)

Mary Lourdes Gillespie Baird (born May 12, 1935) is an Ecuadorian-born American lawyer and jurist who previously served as a United States district judge for the United States District Court for the Central District of California from 1992 to 2004.

== Early life and education ==
Baird was born as Lourdes Gillespie in Quito, Ecuador on May 12, 1935, the seventh child of Josefina Delgado and James C. Gillespie. A year later the family relocated to Los Angeles, California, where Baird was raised a devout Catholic and enrolled in Catholic all-girls schools. After graduating high school, she went to a secretarial college before marrying businessman William T. Baird, with whom she had three children. She then returned to school and went on to receive an Associate of Arts degree from Los Angeles City College in 1971, a Bachelor of Arts degree in sociology from the University of California, Los Angeles in 1973, and a Juris Doctor from the UCLA School of Law in 1976.

== Career ==
Baird was an assistant United States attorney of the Central District of California from 1977 to 1983. She was in private practice in Los Angeles from 1983 to 1986. She was a judge on the East Los Angeles Municipal Court from 1986 to 1987, on the Los Angeles Municipal Court from 1987 to 1988, and on the Superior Court of Los Angeles County from 1988 to 1990. She was the United States Attorney for the Central District of California from 1990 to 1992.

She was an adjunct professor at UCLA School of Law.

== Federal judicial service ==
On April 2, 1992, Baird was nominated by President George H. W. Bush to a new seat on the United States District Court for the Central District of California created by 104 Stat. 5089. This was particularly impressive because she is a Latina and a Republican-turned-Democrat who was nominated by two white Republican men, ahead of "three highly qualified Republican male candidates." She was confirmed by the United States Senate on August 11, 1992, and received her commission on August 12, 1992. She assumed senior status on May 12, 2004, retiring from active service on April 15, 2005.

== See also ==
- List of Hispanic and Latino American jurists

== Sources ==
- Confirmation hearings on federal appointments : hearings before the Committee on the Judiciary, United States Senate, One Hundred Second Congress, first session, on confirmation hearings on appointments to the federal judiciary. pt.9 (1993)

Legal offices
Preceded by Seat established by 104 Stat. 5089	Judge of the United States District Court for the Central District of California; 1992–2004	Succeeded by George P. Schiavelli
