= James V. Selna =

American judge (born 1945)

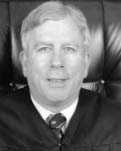

Senior Judge of the United States District Court for the Central District of California
- Incumbent
- Assumed office March 3, 2020

Judge of the United States District Court for the Central District of California
- In office March 27, 2003 – March 3, 2020
- Appointed by: George W. Bush
- Preceded by: John Spencer Letts
- Succeeded by: Sunshine Sykes

Judge of the Superior Court of Orange County
- In office 1998–2003

Personal details
- Born: February 22, 1945 (age 81) San Jose, California, U.S.
- Education: Stanford University (AB, JD)

James V. Selna (born February 22, 1945) is a senior United States district judge of the United States District Court for the Central District of California.

== Early life, education, and military service ==
Selna was born in San Jose, California, on February 22, 1945. He received an A.B. degree from Stanford University in 1967. He graduated with distinction and Phi Beta Kappa. In 1970, Selna received a J.D. from Stanford Law School, where he served on the Stanford Law Review.

Selna was a captain in the U.S. Army Reserve from 1967 to 1978.

== Career in private practice and as state judge ==
Selna was in private practice in California from 1970 to 1998, at the law firm of O'Melveny & Myers, working first from the firm's Los Angeles office and then its Newport Beach office. While in private practice, Selna was involved in a number of significant cases, including Los Angeles Memorial Coliseum Commission v. National Football League, an antitrust case involving the Oakland Raiders' move to Los Angeles, in which Selna was one of the attorneys representing the NFL.

He was a judge on the Superior Court, Orange County, California from 1998 to 2003.

== Federal judicial service ==
Selna was nominated by President George W. Bush to be a Judge of the United States District Court for the Central District of California on January 29, 2003, to a seat vacated by John Spencer Letts. A substantial majority of the American Bar Association's Standing Committee on the Federal Judiciary rated Selna "well qualified" for the position, with a minority abstaining. Selna was confirmed by the United States Senate on March 27, 2003, by a unanimous vote of 97–0. He received his commission the same day. He assumed senior status on March 3, 2020.

=== Notable cases ===
Selna was assigned the case of Farnan v. Capistrano Unified School District, in which Chad Farnan, a Mission Viejo, California high school student, alleged that his AP European History teacher at Capistrano Valley High School had violated the Establishment Clause of the First Amendment to the United States Constitution by making a number of classroom statements in 2007 that the student interpreted as disparaging religion. In May 2009, Selna granted, in part, the by-then-former student's motion for summary judgment, ruling that one statement of the many cited by the student—a comment that creationism was "superstitious nonsense"—did violate the Establishment Clause. Selna ruled, however, that 20 other statements complained of by Farnar did not violate the Establishment Clause. Selna also determined that the teacher was protected by qualified immunity and entered judgment denying the Farnan's request for declaratory, injunctive or monetary relief, and inviting the defendants to apply for recovery of attorney fees and costs. In August 2011, the Ninth Circuit affirmed Selna's finding of qualified immunity, but because it found the immunity issue to be dispositive, vacated that portion of the judgment that dealt with the constitutionality of the teacher's comments.

In 2007, Selna ruled in favor of Broadcom in a major patent infringement suit against Qualcomm. The jury found that Qualcomm had infringed three of Broadcom's patents and returned a $19.64 million award to Qualcomm; Selna doubled that to $39.3 million in damages and legal fees, finding that the infringement was intentional. The following year, Selna found Qualcomm in contempt for violating an injunction ordering it to stop using technology subject to the Broadcom patents.

Selna presided over a complex class action multi-district litigation against Toyota involving the "sudden acceleration" issue (see 2009–11 Toyota vehicle recalls).

In 2015, Selna presided over a case brought by an operator of sober-living homes against the city of Costa Mesa, California. The operator challenged the city's ordinance requiring "sober-living homes in single-family neighborhoods to obtain special permits and be at least 650 feet from one another." Selna rejected the operator's claim that the ordinance improperly discriminated against recovering substance abusers and dismissed the suit.

In 2016, Selna oversaw the case of Peter "Sana" Ojeda, a leader of the Mexican Mafia in Orange County, California. After Ojeda was convicted of racketeering, Selna sentenced him to 15 years in federal prison, finding that Ojeda remained a danger to the community despite his advanced age.

On August 16, 2023, he rejected a proposed $200 million settlement in a class-action lawsuit prompted by a rise in thefts of vehicles manufactured by South Korean automakers Hyundai and Kia. On November 17, 2023, he rejected requests by Kia and Hyundai to halt lawsuits from American cities suing the automakers.

== Personal life ==
Selna had previously served as a member of the board of trustees for the Orange County Museum of Art and Newport Harbor Art Museum, and as a member of the board of directors for the Orange County Business Committee for the Arts.

Legal offices
Preceded by John Spencer Letts	Judge of the United States District Court for the Central District of California; 2003–2020	Succeeded by Sunshine Sykes
