= Gary Allen Feess =

American judge (born 1948)

Senior Judge of the United States District Court for the Central District of California
- In office March 13, 2014 – January 5, 2015

Judge of the United States District Court for the Central District of California
- In office July 7, 1999 – March 13, 2014
- Appointed by: Bill Clinton
- Preceded by: James M. Ideman
- Succeeded by: André Birotte Jr.

Judge of the Los Angeles Superior Court
- In office 1996–1999

Personal details
- Born: March 13, 1948 (age 78) Alliance, Ohio, U.S.
- Education: Ohio State University (BA); UCLA School of Law (JD)

Gary Allen Feess (born March 13, 1948) is a former United States district judge of the United States District Court for the Central District of California.

== Education and career ==
Feess was born in Alliance, Ohio. He received a Bachelor of Arts degree from Ohio State University in 1970 and a Juris Doctor from the UCLA School of Law in 1974. He was in private practice in Los Angeles, California from 1974 to 1979, from 1987 to 1988, and again from 1989 to 1996. He was an Assistant United States Attorney in the Central District of California from 1979 to 1987 and Chief Assistant United States Attorney from 1988 to 1989. Later, he was a general counsel for the Christopher Commission. He was a judge on the Los Angeles Superior Court from 1996 to 1999.

== Federal judicial service ==
Feess was nominated by President Bill Clinton on January 26, 1999, to a United States District Court for the Central District of California seat that had been vacated by James M. Ideman. Feess was confirmed by the United States Senate on June 30, 1999, and received his commission on July 7, 1999. In 2000, Feess was selected to be the judge in charge of implementing the consent decree filed against the Los Angeles Police Department in the aftermath of the Rodney King riots and the Rampart scandal. Feess assumed senior status on March 13, 2014. He retired from active service on January 5, 2015.

Legal offices
Preceded by James M. Ideman	Judge of the United States District Court for the Central District of California; 1999–2014	Succeeded by André Birotte Jr.
