= Lawrence Tupper Lydick =

American judge

Senior judge of the United States District Court for the Central District of California
- In office March 1, 1984 – December 17, 1995

Judge of the United States District Court for the Central District of California
- In office July 29, 1971 – March 1, 1984
- Appointed by: Richard Nixon
- Preceded by: Thurmond Clarke
- Succeeded by: James M. Ideman

Personal details
- Born: Lawrence Tupper Lydick; June 22, 1916 San Diego, California
- Died: December 17, 1995 (aged 79) Laguna Beach, California
- Education: Stanford University (A.B.); Stanford Law School (J.D.)

Lawrence Tupper Lydick (June 22, 1916 – December 17, 1995) was a United States district judge of the United States District Court for the Central District of California.

== Education and career ==
Born in San Diego, California, Lydick received an Artium Baccalaureus degree from Stanford University in 1938 and a Juris Doctor from Stanford Law School in 1942. He was acting director of the Disputes Division of the Tenth Region of the National War Labor Board from 1942 to 1943. He was a United States Naval Reserve Lieutenant during World War II, from 1943 to 1946. He was an assistant to president and general counsel of United States Grant Export-Import, Ltd. in Los Angeles, California from 1946 to 1948. He was in private practice in Los Angeles from 1948 to 1971.

== Federal judicial service ==
Lydick was nominated by President Richard Nixon on July 8, 1971, to a seat on the United States District Court for the Central District of California vacated by Judge Thurmond Clarke. He was confirmed by the United States Senate on July 29, 1971, and received his commission the same day. He assumed senior status on March 1, 1984, due to a certified disability. Lydick served in that capacity until his death on December 17, 1995, in Laguna Beach, California.

== Sources ==
Legal offices
Preceded by Thurmond Clarke	Judge of the United States District Court for the Central District of California; 1971–1984	Succeeded by James M. Ideman
