= Thurmond Clarke =

American judge

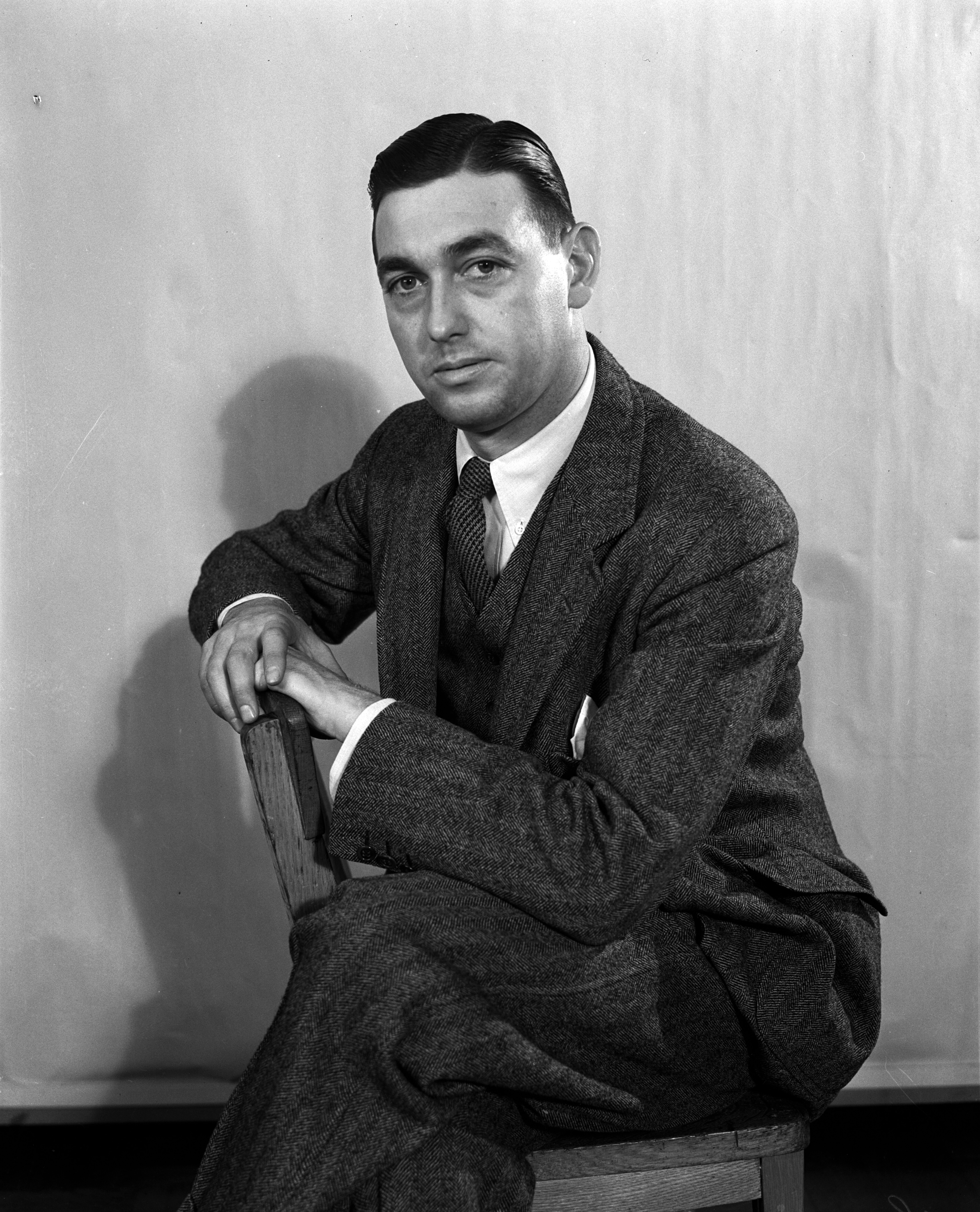
- Clarke in 1935

Senior Judge of the United States District Court for the Central District of California
- In office September 1, 1970 – February 28, 1971

Chief Judge of the United States District Court for the Central District of California
- In office 1966–1970
- Preceded by: Office established
- Succeeded by: Albert Lee Stephens Jr.

Judge of the United States District Court for the Central District of California
- In office September 18, 1966 – September 1, 1970
- Appointed by: operation of law
- Preceded by: Seat established by 80 Stat. 75
- Succeeded by: Lawrence Tupper Lydick

Chief Judge of the United States District Court for the Southern District of California
- In office 1966
- Preceded by: William Matthew Byrne Sr.
- Succeeded by: James Marshall Carter

Judge of the United States District Court for the Southern District of California
- In office August 3, 1955 – September 18, 1966
- Appointed by: Dwight D. Eisenhower
- Preceded by: Seat established by 68 Stat. 8
- Succeeded by: Seat abolished

Personal details
- Born: Thurmond Clarke; June 29, 1902 Santa Paula, California, U.S.
- Died: February 28, 1971 (aged 68)
- Education: USC Gould School of Law (LL.B.)

Thurmond Clarke (June 29, 1902 – February 28, 1971) was a United States district judge of the United States District Court for the Southern District of California and the United States District Court for the Central District of California.

== Education and career ==
Born in Santa Paula, California, Clarke graduated from Los Angeles High School and received a Bachelor of Laws from the USC Gould School of Law in 1927. He was a deputy district attorney of Los Angeles County, California from 1927 to 1929, and then a deputy city attorney of the City of Los Angeles from 1929 to 1932. He was a Judge of the Los Angeles Municipal Court from 1932 to 1935, appointed by Governor James Rolph and was elevated to the Superior Court of Los Angeles County by Governor Frank Merriam, serving in that position from 1935 to 1955.

In December 1945, Judge Clarke dismissed the suit of eight white property owners who tried to force fifty African-American occupants (250 residents) from the West Adams area in Los Angeles. Plaintiffs contended that the defendants had violated property restrictions against blacks. The defendants, who included actress Hattie McDaniel and singer Ethel Waters, replied that the original subdivision restrictions had expired and that more than half of the area was then owned by black people. Clark decided that no testimony would be taken in the case, stating that:

It is time that members of the Negro race are accorded, without reservations and evasions, the full rights guaranteed them under the 14th amendment of the Federal Constitution. Judges have been avoiding the real issue too long. Certainly there was no discrimination against the Negro race when it came to calling upon its members to die on the battlefields in defense of this country in the war just ended.

Clarke’s ruling made him “the first judge in America to use the 14th Amendment to disallow the enforcement of covenant race restrictions. The decision ... set an important precedent for future suits concerning racial covenants."

== Federal judicial service ==
Clarke was nominated by President Dwight D. Eisenhower on June 21, 1955, to the United States District Court for the Southern District of California, to a new seat authorized by 68 Stat. 8. He was confirmed by the United States Senate on August 1, 1955, and received his commission on August 3, 1955. He served as Chief Judge in 1966. Clarke was reassigned by operation of law to the United States District Court for the Central District of California on September 18, 1966, to a new seat authorized by 80 Stat. 75. He served as Chief Judge from 1966 to 1970. In July 1970 at La Casa Pacifica he swore James Day Hodgson into office as Secretary of Labor for the Nixon administration. Clarke assumed senior status on September 1, 1970.

His sentencing practices were criticized as unorthodox and lenient by other judges, such as his predecessor Chief Judge Peirson Hall.

== Personal life ==
Thurmond Clarke was the son of Judge Robert M. Clarke, who at 21 years old became the youngest state legislator in California history. After divorcing in 1937, he married again in 1944 to Athalie Richardson Irvine, who was his high school classmate. He was father to Frances and stepfather to Joan Irvine Smith.
