= James M. Ideman =

American judge (born 1931)

Senior Judge of the United States District Court for the Central District of California
- In office April 2, 1998 – September 11, 1998

Judge of the United States District Court for the Central District of California
- In office June 15, 1984 – April 2, 1998
- Appointed by: Ronald Reagan
- Preceded by: Lawrence Tupper Lydick
- Succeeded by: Gary Allen Feess

Judge of the Los Angeles County Superior Court
- In office 1979–1984

Personal details
- Born: James Merle Ideman; April 2, 1931 (age 95) Rockford, Illinois, U.S.
- Spouse: Gertraud Krahnert
- Education: The Citadel (BA); University of Southern California (JD)

Military service
- Branch/service: United States Army
- Years of service: 1949–1950 (enlisted); 1953–1956 (officer); 1965–1984 (reserve)
- Rank: Colonel
- Unit: U.S. Third Army Area; United States Army Alaska; 82nd Airborne Division; U.S. Army Special Forces; J.A.G. Corps

James Merle Ideman (born April 2, 1931) is a former United States district judge of the United States District Court for the Central District of California.

== Education and career ==
Born in Rockford, Illinois, Ideman received a Bachelor of Arts degree from The Citadel in 1953 and a Juris Doctor from the USC Gould School of Law in 1963. He served in the United States Army from 1949 to 1950, from 1953 to 1956, and from 1965 to 1984. From 1963 to 1964 he was a law clerk to superior court judge McIntyre Faries. He was a deputy district attorney of Los Angeles County, California from 1964 to 1979, and a judge of the Los Angeles County Superior Court, California from 1979 to 1984.

== Federal judicial service ==
On May 24, 1984, Ideman was nominated by President Ronald Reagan to a seat on the United States District Court for the Central District of California vacated by Judge Lawrence Tupper Lydick. Ideman was confirmed by the United States Senate on June 15, 1984, and received his commission the same day. He assumed senior status on April 2, 1998, retiring fully on September 11, 1998.

== Sources ==
Legal offices
| Preceded by Lawrence Tupper Lydick | Judge of the United States District Court for the Central District of California; 1984–1998 | Succeeded by Gary Allen Feess |
