= Mark C. Scarsi =

American judge (born 1964)

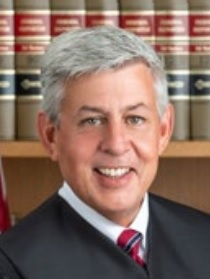

Judge of the United States District Court for the Central District of California
- Incumbent
- Assumed office September 18, 2020
- Appointed by: Donald Trump
- Preceded by: George H. King

Personal details
- Born: Mark Christopher Scarsi; 1964 (age 61–62) Syracuse, New York, U.S.
- Education: Syracuse University (BS, MS); Georgetown University (JD)

Mark Christopher Scarsi (born 1964) is an American lawyer who has served as a United States district judge of the United States District Court for the Central District of California since 2020.

Scarsi was confirmed with broad bipartisan support by an 83–12 vote. Prior to his confirmation, Scarsi served as a corporate litigator in Los Angeles.

== Early life, education, and career ==
Scarsi was born in 1964 in Syracuse, New York. He studied computer science at Syracuse University, graduating in 1987 with a Bachelor of Science. From 1987 to 1993, Scarsi worked as a software engineer for GE Aviation and Lockheed Martin, designing and developing detection and signal processing computer systems for U.S. defense applications. He also did graduate study in computer science at Syracuse, receiving a Master of Science in 1993. He then attended Georgetown University Law Center, graduating in 1996 with a Juris Doctor, magna cum laude, and Order of the Coif honors.

== Career ==
After graduating from law school, Scarsi was in private practice at the Los Angeles-based intellectual property law firm Christie, Parker & Hale (now part of Lewis Roca Rothgerber Christie) from 1996 to 1998. From 1998 to 2007, Scarsi was in practice at O'Melveny & Myers, becoming a partner in 2003. In 2007, he joined Milbank, Tweed, Hadley & McCloy, where he served as the chair of the firm's Global Intellectual Property Practice and as the Los Angeles office's managing partner. Scarsi noted he only became a Federalist Society member in 2017 prior to his judicial nomination.

=== Federal judicial service ===
On October 10, 2018, President Donald Trump announced his intent to nominate Scarsi to serve as a United States district judge of the United States District Court for the Central District of California. On November 13, 2018, his nomination was sent to the Senate. President Trump nominated Scarsi to the seat vacated by Judge George H. King, who retired on January 6, 2017.

On January 3, 2019, his nomination was returned to the President under Rule XXXI, Paragraph 6 of the United States Senate. On January 30, 2019, President Trump announced his intent to renominate Scarsi to the district court. On February 6, 2019, his nomination was sent to the Senate. A hearing on his nomination before the Senate Judiciary Committee was held on November 13, 2019. On January 3, 2020, his nomination was once again returned to the President under Rule XXXI, Paragraph 6 of the United States Senate. On January 9, 2020, he was renominated to the same seat. On March 5, 2020, his nomination was reported out of committee by voice vote. On September 14, 2020, the Senate invoked cloture on his nomination by a 77–12 vote. On September 15, 2020, his nomination was confirmed by an 83–12 vote. He received his judicial commission on September 18, 2020.

Prior to President Biden's pardon of Hunter Biden in December 2024, he presided over Hunter Biden's case related to tax charges. On September 5, 2024, Scarsi accepted Hunter Biden's guilty plea to three felonies and six misdemeanors.

Scarsi also serves as the judge in the lawsuit against UCLA related to the Israel-Palestine protests on campus.

Legal offices
Preceded by George H. King	Judge of the United States District Court for the Central District of California; 2020–present	Incumbent
