= John Kronstadt =

American judge (born 1951)

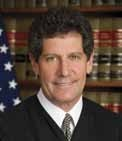

Senior Judge of the United States District Court for the Central District of California
- Incumbent
- Assumed office April 1, 2022

Judge of the United States District Court for the Central District of California
- In office April 14, 2011 – April 1, 2022
- Appointed by: Barack Obama
- Preceded by: Florence-Marie Cooper
- Succeeded by: Mónica Ramírez Almadani

Judge of the Los Angeles County Superior Court
- In office 2002–2011
- Appointed by: Gray Davis
- Preceded by: Juelann Cathey
- Succeeded by: Roberto Longoria

Personal details
- Born: March 5, 1951 (age 75) Washington, D.C., U.S.
- Education: Cornell University (BA); Yale University (JD)

John Arnold Kronstadt (born March 5, 1951) is a senior United States district judge of the United States District Court for the Central District of California.

== Early life and education ==
Kronstadt was born in 1951. He graduated from Cornell University in 1973 with a Bachelor of Arts. At Cornell, he was a member of the Quill and Dagger society. He earned his Juris Doctor from Yale Law School in 1976. After completing law school, Kronstadt served as a law clerk for Judge William Percival Gray of the United States District Court for the Central District of California.

== Judicial service ==
=== State judicial service ===
In October 2002, governor Gray Davis appointed Kronstadt to the Los Angeles County Superior Court. He replaced Judge Juelann Cathey, who had retired earlier that year following major heart surgery.

While a superior court judge, Kronstadt presided over the case to determine rightful ownership of the Bahia Emerald, an 840-pound gemstone that has previously been valued at $372 million. During his state judicial service, only one of Kronstadt's decisions was reversed.

=== Federal judicial service ===
On November 17, 2010, President Barack Obama nominated Kronstadt to a judgeship on the United States District Court for the Central District of California to a seat vacated by Judge Florence-Marie Cooper, who died on January 15, 2010. On April 12, 2011, the Senate confirmed his nomination by a 96–0 vote. Kronstadt received his judicial commission two days later. He assumed senior status on April 1, 2022.

== Personal ==
Kronstadt is married to California 2nd District Court of Appeal Justice Helen Bendix.

Legal offices
Preceded by Florence-Marie Cooper	Judge of the United States District Court for the Central District of California; 2011–2022	Succeeded by Mónica Ramírez Almadani
