= George P. Schiavelli =

American judge (1948–2019)

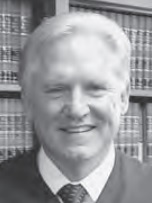

Judge of the United States District Court for the Central District of California
- In office July 8, 2004 – October 5, 2008
- Appointed by: George W. Bush
- Preceded by: Lourdes Baird
- Succeeded by: Dolly Gee

Personal details
- Born: June 15, 1948 Miami Beach, Florida, U.S.
- Died: August 28, 2019 (aged 71)
- Education: Stanford University (AB); UCLA School of Law (JD)

George P. Schiavelli (June 15, 1948 – August 28, 2019) was a United States district judge of the United States District Court for the Central District of California.

== Education and career ==
Born in Miami Beach, Florida, Schiavelli received an Artium Baccalaureus degree from Stanford University in 1970 and a Juris Doctor from the UCLA School of Law in 1974. He was in private practice in Los Angeles, California from 1974 to 1994 and again from 2000 to 2004, having served as a judge on the State of California Los Angeles Superior Court from 1994 to 2000. He had Italian roots, was president of the Italian American Lawyers Association in 1990.

== Federal judicial service ==
On January 20, 2004, Schiavelli was nominated by President George W. Bush to a seat on the United States District Court for the Central District of California vacated by Lourdes Baird. Schiavelli was confirmed by the United States Senate on June 24, 2004, and received his commission on July 8, 2004. He served in that capacity until his resignation from the bench on October 5, 2008. He then returned to private practice in Los Angeles.

== Death ==
Schiavelli died on August 28, 2019, aged 71.

== Sources ==
Legal offices
Preceded by Lourdes Baird	Judge of the United States District Court for the Central District of California; 2004–2008	Succeeded by Dolly Gee
