= E. Martin Estrada =

American lawyer (born 1976/77)

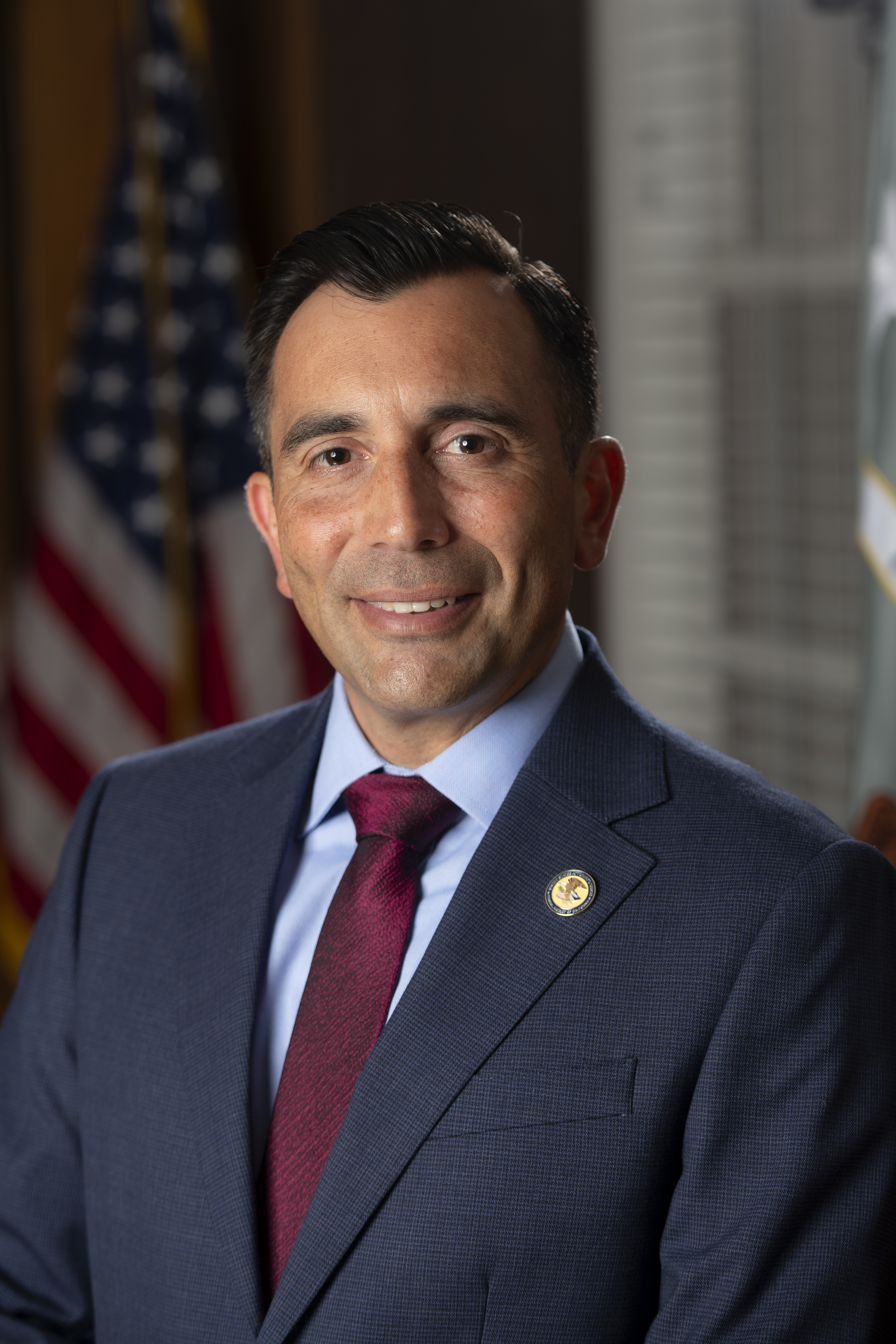

United States Attorney for the Central District of California
- In office September 19, 2022 – January 17, 2025
- Appointed by: Joe Biden
- Preceded by: Nicola T. Hanna
- Succeeded by: Joseph T. McNally (acting); Bill Essayli (interim)

Personal details
- Born: Esteban Martin Estrada; 1976 or 1977 (age 49–50)
- Education: University of California, Irvine (BA); Stanford University (JD)

Esteban Martin Estrada (born 1976/1977) is an American lawyer who served as the United States attorney for the Central District of California from September 2022 to January 2025.

== Early life and education ==
Estrada's family emigrated from Guatemala, and he grew up in the Costa Mesa area. He received a Bachelor of Arts, magna cum laude, from the University of California, Irvine in 1998 and his Juris Doctor from Stanford Law School, with distinction, in 2002.

== Career ==
After graduating law school, Estrada served as a law clerk for Judge Robert Timlin of the United States District Court for the Central District of California from 2002 to 2003 and Judge Arthur Alarcón of the United States Court of Appeals for the Ninth Circuit from 2003 to 2004.

He served as an Assistant United States Attorney in the United States Attorney's Office for the Central District of California from 2007 to 2014. In 2014, he became a partner at Munger, Tolles & Olson; he served as an associate at the same firm from 2004 to 2007.

As a partner with the firm, Estrada represented Plains All American Pipeline in the Refugio oil spill, in which the company agreed to pay $230 million to settle claims. He defended Southern California Edison in a lawsuit claiming one of the utility's substations emitted stray voltage that harmed nearby residents. He also represented boxer Deontay Wilder. In pro bono work, he was the lead attorney in the case involving Bruce's Beach, where he helped return the land to the legal heirs of Charles and Willa Bruce in 2022. He also has experience with immigration and education cases, one in which he successfully argued that New Mexico was providing insufficient education to students, including Latino and Native American students.

=== U.S. Attorney for the Central District of California ===
On June 6, 2022, President Joe Biden nominated Estrada to be the United States attorney for the Central District of California. His nomination was supported by Senator Alex Padilla. On July 28, 2022, his nomination was reported out of the Senate Judiciary Committee by a voice vote. On September 13, 2022, his nomination was confirmed in the United States Senate by voice vote. He was sworn in by Chief Judge Philip S. Gutierrez on September 19, 2022.

While at the U.S. Attorney's Office, Estrada was involved in cases involving hate crimes, civil rights, violent crime, national security, synthetic drugs, public corruption, corporate fraud, environmental justice, and protecting vulnerable communities.

==== National Security and Drug Enforcement ====
While in office, Estrada was active against threats from China. In 2023, he secured a prison sentence for a U.S. Navy sailor who exchanged sensitive U.S. military information with China. In 2024, his office prosecuted a political campaign manager who was alleged to be an agent of the Chinese government, and indicted a Chinese company that was exporting the chemical ingredients of fentanyl into the US, packaged as cosmetic makeup.

In December 2024, he charged and had arrested a man who illegally exported military equipment to North Korea.

Estrada went after drug traffickers including the dismantling of "Operation Dead Hand", a trafficking ring of Mexican Cartels, Los Angeles drug dealers and Canadian truck drivers. He also secured the arrests of two dozen individuals involved in a money laundering scheme between the Sinaloa Cartel and Chinese underground backing groups.

Estrada also led the investigation and charges against the individuals involved in supplying Matthew Perry with the drugs that led to his death in late 2023.

==== Operation Safe Cities ====
Estrada launched Operation Safe Cities in early 2024 to encourage local law enforcement to refer violent crimes involving firearms to federal prosecutors, and helped start the Figueroa Corridor Trafficking Initiative. This federal and local cooperation helped prosecute violent crimes, including the conviction and sentencing of the murderers of LAPD Officer Fernando Arroyos, and the arrests and indictments of street gang members responsible for the murder of two El Monte police officers. Estrada also supported the arrest of rapper Lil Durk related to a murder for hire plot.

==== Cybersecurity ====
In 2023, Estrada's office helped recover $9 million of stolen cryptocurrency by dismantling the criminal malware network called "Qakbot". The next year, Estrada's office charged two Sudanese brothers who carried out 35,000 hacks as part of a 'cyber-attack for hire' operation, and charged members of the hacker community Scattered Spider.

==== Public Corruption and White-Collar Crime ====
Estrada's establishment of the Corporate and Securities Fraud Strike Force in 2023 led to significant cases against corporate executives and insiders in the following months. These included fraud charges against FAT Brands Inc. executives, short seller Andrew Left, and the conviction of Ippei Mizuhara, the interpreter who defrauded baseball superstar Shohei Ohtani over $16 million in relation to a sports gambling scheme.

Estrada also led the investigation and conviction of several public officials, including former Los Angeles City Councilman Mark Ridley-Thomas on bribery charges in 2023. In 2024, Estrada's office secured a 13-year prison sentence for corruption convictions of councilman Jose Huizar and 12 years for former deputy mayor Raymond Chan, who was convicted of bribery. Later in 2024, Estrada's investigation led former Orange County Supervisor Andrew Do to plead guilty of conspiring to commit bribery.

==== Civil Rights and Hate Crimes ====
Estrada prosecuted City National Bank in 2023, whose refusal to finance mortgages in Black and Latino communities resulted in a settlement of $31 million. He also addressed hate crimes, including the prosecution of a former Marine who firebombed a Planned Parenthood clinic in 2022, and the indictment of a white supremacist gang in October 2024.

==== Vulnerable Communities Task Force ====
Estrada started the Vulnerable Communities Task Force in 2023 to address scams targeting marginalized groups. The force led to the conviction of the well-known disbarred attorney Tom Girardi on embezzlement charges. Estrada also pursued environmental abusers including the indictment of Phillips 66 for Clean Water Act violations, and reached a $20 million settlement with Los Angeles for wastewater discharge violations.

On January 14, 2025, Estrada announced he would be resigning from the post, effective January 17. he was replaced by his First Assistant Joseph T. McNally.

=== Return to private sector ===
In February 2025, Estrada returned to Munger, Tolles & Olson.

In November 2025, Estrada became the co-managing partner of the firm, beginning a three year tenure.

Legal offices
Preceded by Nicola T. Hanna	United States Attorney for the Central District of California; 2022–2025	Succeeded by Joseph T. McNally (acting); Bill Essayli (interim)
