= Elisha Avery Crary =

American judge

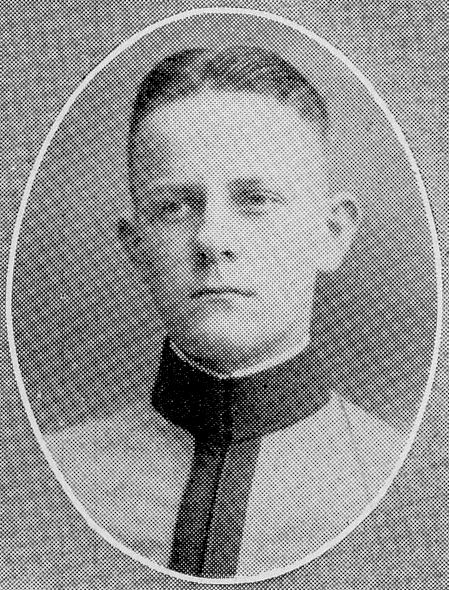
- Crary at West Point in 1926

Senior Judge of the United States District Court for the Central District of California
- In office June 24, 1975 – April 28, 1978

Judge of the United States District Court for the Central District of California
- In office September 18, 1966 – June 24, 1975
- Appointed by: operation of law
- Preceded by: Seat established by 80 Stat. 75
- Succeeded by: Robert Mitsuhiro Takasugi

Judge of the United States District Court for the Southern District of California
- In office August 28, 1962 – September 18, 1966
- Appointed by: John F. Kennedy
- Preceded by: Ernest Allen Tolin
- Succeeded by: Seat abolished

Personal details
- Born: Elisha Avery Crary; June 24, 1905 Grundy Center, Iowa, U.S.
- Died: April 28, 1978 (aged 72) Newport Beach, California, U.S.
- Education: University of Southern California (B.A.); USC Gould School of Law (J.D.)

Elisha Avery Crary (June 24, 1905 – April 28, 1978) was a United States district judge of the United States District Court for the Southern District of California and the United States District Court for the Central District of California.

== Education and career ==
Born in Grundy Center, Iowa, Crary attended the United States Military Academy at West Point, but did not graduate. He received a Bachelor of Arts degree from the University of Southern California in 1929, and a Juris Doctor from the USC Gould School of Law in 1929. He was in private practice in Los Angeles from 1930 to 1941. Having joined the United States Army Reserve in 1931, he served in World War II from 1941 to 1946. He remained in the reserves thereafter until 1957, and was in private practice in Los Angeles from 1946 to 1961. In 1958, Crary served as President of the Los Angeles County Bar Association. He was a Judge of the Superior Court of Los Angeles County from 1961 to 1962.

== Federal judicial service ==
Crary was nominated by President John F. Kennedy on July 31, 1962, to a seat on the United States District Court for the Southern District of California vacated by Judge Ernest Allen Tolin. He was confirmed by the United States Senate on August 25, 1962, and received his commission on August 28, 1962. He was reassigned by operation of law to the United States District Court for the Central District of California on September 18, 1966, to a new seat authorized by 80 Stat. 75. He assumed senior status on June 24, 1975. His service terminated on April 28, 1978, due to his death from cancer in Newport Beach.

== Sources ==
Legal offices
Preceded by Ernest Allen Tolin	Judge of the United States District Court for the Southern District of California; 1962–1966	Succeeded by Seat abolished
Preceded by Seat established by 80 Stat. 75	Judge of the United States District Court for the Central District of California; 1966–1975	Succeeded by Robert Mitsuhiro Takasugi
