= United States v. Ingalls =

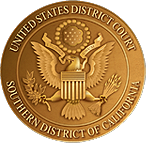
- Court: U.S. District Court for the Southern District of California
- Full case name: United States v. Ingalls (1947), 73 F. Supp. 76 (S.D. Cal. 1947)
- Started: July 29, 1947
- Citation: https://law.justia.com/cases/federal/district-courts/FSupp/73/76/2125385/

In United States v. Ingalls (1947), 73 F. Supp. 76 (S.D. Cal. 1947), the Civil Rights Section of the Department of Justice prosecuted a Thirteenth Amendment case – a Reconstruction era amendment which prohibited slavery and involuntary servitude except as a punishment for a crime. This was the first case using the Thirteenth Amendment in the 20th century.

== Background ==
In 1908, Mrs. Mira Elizabeth Ingalls, a white woman, discovered that her husband was having a sexual relationship with Dora Jones, their then-17-year-old African-American maid. After divorcing her husband, Ingalls blackmailed Jones into continuing to work as her maid. Ingalls told Jones that if she tried to leave, she would have her arrested. Ernest Tolin, the assistant attorney who prosecuted the case, quoted Mrs. Ingalls telling Jones – "You owe me your life because you have ruined mine."

Authorities claimed that Mrs. and Mr. Ingalls had not paid Jones any compensation since 1909 and that Jones' sleeping quarters were so cold "a subsequent tenant would not keep her cat in the room." The abuse spanned a total of 37 years and across different places, including San Diego, Boston, Washington, and Chicago. In 1946, Mrs. Helen Roberts, Mrs. Ingalls's daughter, encouraged Jones to tell Berkeley authorities of her treatment after seeing that Jones' was “thin, tired looking, and her ankles were badly swollen” during a visit from her mother, stepfather, and Jones.

== Decision ==
Mrs. Ingalls did not serve prison time but was ordered by a judge to pay Jones $6,000 in compensation for lost wages.
