= Beverly Reid O'Connell =

American judge (1965–2017)

Judge of the United States District Court for the Central District of California
- In office April 30, 2013 – October 8, 2017
- Appointed by: Barack Obama
- Preceded by: Valerie Baker Fairbank
- Succeeded by: Kenly Kiya Kato

Judge of the Los Angeles County Superior Court
- In office 2005–2013
- Appointed by: Arnold Schwarzenegger
- Succeeded by: Christopher K. Lui

Personal details
- Born: Beverly Ann Reid; May 12, 1965 Ventura, California, U.S.
- Died: October 8, 2017 (aged 52)
- Party: Democratic
- Spouse: Dan O'Connell
- Education: University of California, Los Angeles (BA); Pepperdine University (JD)

Beverly Reid O'Connell (née Reid; May 12, 1965 – October 8, 2017) was an American lawyer and judge. She was a judge on the Los Angeles County Superior Court from 2005 to 2013, and a United States district judge of the United States District Court for the Central District of California from 2013 until her death.

== Early life and education ==
O'Connell was born Beverly Ann Reid on May 12, 1965, in Ventura, California. She received her Bachelor of Arts degree in 1986 from the University of California, Los Angeles. She received her Juris Doctor, magna cum laude, in 1990 from Pepperdine University School of Law.

== Career ==
O'Connell worked at the law firm of Morrison & Foerster from 1990 to 1995, where she handled a variety of civil litigation matters. She served as an Assistant United States Attorney in the Central District of California from 1995 to 2005.

O'Connell was appointed by Governor Arnold Schwarzenegger to the Los Angeles County Superior Court in 2005, and served on that court until 2013. For five months in 2010 and 2011, she sat by designation on the California Court of Appeal for the Second Appellate District, Division 8. She also served as Assistant Supervising Judge with the North Valley District of the Superior Court.

=== Federal judicial service ===
On November 14, 2012, President Barack Obama nominated O'Connell to serve as a United States district judge for the United States District Court for the Central District of California, to the seat vacated by Judge Valerie Baker Fairbank, who assumed senior status due to a certified disability on March 1, 2012. On January 2, 2013, her nomination was returned to the President, due to the sine die adjournment of the Senate. On January 3, 2013, she was renominated to the same office. Her nomination was reported by the Senate Judiciary Committee on February 14, 2013, by voice vote. On April 15, 2013, the U.S. Senate unanimously confirmed her nomination, on a 92–0 vote. She received her commission on April 30, 2013.

On the federal bench, O'Connell presided over several notable cases. In 2014, O'Connell presided over a copyright infringement lawsuit against Kanye West and his record label UMG Recordings for West's song "Gold Digger"; she dismissed most of the claims on a motion for judgment on the pleadings. In 2015, she denied a petition for habeas corpus by Sirhan Sirhan, who is imprisoned for life for assassinating Robert F. Kennedy.

O'Connell was also a member of the board of visitors for her alma mater, Pepperdine University School of Law (later renamed the Rick J. Caruso School of Law).

== Personal life and death ==
Beverly Reid O'Connell was married to fellow attorney Dan O'Connell, whom she met at Pepperdine. She lived in Pasadena, California.

On September 15, 2017, O'Connell collapsed from a brain aneurysm and fell into a coma. She died on October 8, 2017, at the age of 52.

Legal offices
Preceded by Valerie Baker Fairbank	Judge of the United States District Court for the Central District of California; 2013–2017	Succeeded by Kenly Kiya Kato
