= George H. King (judge) =

American judge

George Herbert King
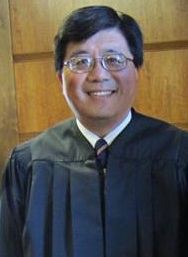

Chief Judge of the United States District Court for the Central District of California
- In office September 14, 2012 – June 30, 2016
- Preceded by: Audrey B. Collins
- Succeeded by: Virginia A. Phillips

Judge of the United States District Court for the Central District of California
- In office June 30, 1995 – January 6, 2017
- Appointed by: Bill Clinton
- Preceded by: Seat established by 104 Stat. 5089
- Succeeded by: Mark C. Scarsi

Magistrate Judge of the United States District Court for the Central District of California
- In office April 1987 – June 1995

Personal details
- Born: George Herbert King; October 12, 1951 (age 74) Shanghai, China
- Spouse: Pamala J. Dockery
- Education: UCLA (BA); USC Gould School of Law (JD)

George Herbert King (born October 12, 1951) is a former United States district judge of the United States District Court for the Central District of California.

== Education and career ==
King was born in Shanghai, China. He received a Bachelor of Arts degree from the University of California, Los Angeles in 1971 and a Juris Doctor from the USC Gould School of Law at the University of Southern California in 1974. He was in private practice in Los Angeles, California from 1974 to 1975.

In 1971 he was a personnel clerk for Coca-Cola Bottling Company. From 1972 to 1975 he served as a law clerk and an associate for three different law firms.

He was an Assistant United States Attorney for the Central District of California from 1975 to 1979. King returned to private practice from 1979 to 1986. At the same time, he acted as a hearing examiner for the Los Angeles Police Commission from 1980 to 1982.

== Federal judicial service ==
In 1987, King became a United States magistrate judge for the Central District of California. On April 27, 1995, President Bill Clinton nominated King to be a United States District Judge for the United States District Court for the Central District of California, to a new seat created by 104 Stat. 5089. He was confirmed by the United States Senate on June 30, 1995, and received his commission the same day. He served as Chief Judge from September 14, 2012, to June 30, 2016. He retired on January 6, 2017.

== Notable case ==
In perhaps his most famous ruling, King granted summary judgment in the case of Rupa Marya v. Warner/Chappell Music Inc. in favor of the plaintiffs, holding that defendants had no valid copyright in the Happy Birthday song, in a decision filed September 22, 2015.

== See also ==
- List of Asian American jurists

== Sources ==
Legal offices
Preceded by Seat established by 104 Stat. 5089	Judge of the United States District Court for the Central District of California; 1995–2017	Succeeded by Mark C. Scarsi
Preceded by Audrey B. Collins	Chief Judge of the United States District Court for the Central District of California; 2012–2016	Succeeded by Virginia A. Phillips
