= Michelle Williams Court =

American judge (born 1966)

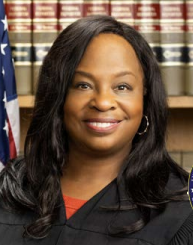

Judge of the United States District Court for the Central District of California
- Incumbent
- Assumed office November 7, 2024
- Appointed by: Joe Biden
- Preceded by: Dale S. Fischer

Judge of the Los Angeles County Superior Court
- In office 2012 – November 7, 2024
- Appointed by: Jerry Brown
- Preceded by: Conrad R. Aragon
- Succeeded by: Hoa Hoang

Personal details
- Born: Michelle Annette Williams; 1966 (age 59–60) Great Falls, Montana, U.S.
- Party: Democratic
- Education: Pomona College (BA); Loyola Marymount University (JD)

Michelle Williams Court (born 1966) is an American lawyer who has served as a United States district judge of the United States District Court for the Central District of California since 2024. She previously served as a judge of the Los Angeles County Superior Court from 2012 to 2024.

== Education ==
Court earned a Bachelor of Arts from Pomona College in 1988 and a Juris Doctor from Loyola Law School in 1993.

== Career ==
Court started her career as an associate at Gilbert Kelly Crowley & Jennett, where she was employed from 1993 to 1994. From 1994 to 1995, she was a project attorney at the ACLU of Southern California. Court was a litigation associate at Litt & Marquez from 1995 to 1999. From 1999 to 2000, she was a fellow and civil rights specialist at the U.S. Department of Housing and Urban Development and from 2000 to 2002, she was a senior associate at Milberg, Weiss, Bershad, Hynes & Lerach. From 2002 to 2011, Court worked as an attorney and later vice president and general counsel at Bet Tzedek Legal Services. On December 27, 2011, Court was appointed by California Governor Jerry Brown to serve as a judge of the Los Angeles County Superior Court to fill the vacancy left by the retirement of Judge Conrad R. Aragon. From 2023 to 2024, she was the supervising judge in the civil division of the court.

=== Federal judicial service ===
On April 24, 2024, President Joe Biden announced his intent to nominate Court to serve as a United States district judge of the United States District Court for the Central District of California. On April 30, 2024, her nomination was sent to the Senate. President Biden nominated Court to the seat vacated by Judge Dale S. Fischer, who assumed senior status on May 1, 2024. On May 22, 2024, a hearing on her nomination was held before the Senate Judiciary Committee. On July 11, 2024, her nomination was reported out of committee by an 11–10 vote. On September 18, 2024, the United States Senate invoked cloture on her nomination by a 51–44 vote. Later that day, her nomination was confirmed by a 49–44 vote. She received her judicial commission on November 7, 2024.

== Personal life ==
Court is married to Jamie Court. The couple live in Los Angeles with two sons.

== See also ==
- List of African American federal judges
- List of African American jurists

Legal offices
| Preceded by Dale S. Fischer | Judge of the United States District Court for the Central District of California; 2024–present | Incumbent |
