= Albert Lee Stephens Jr. =

United States federal judge

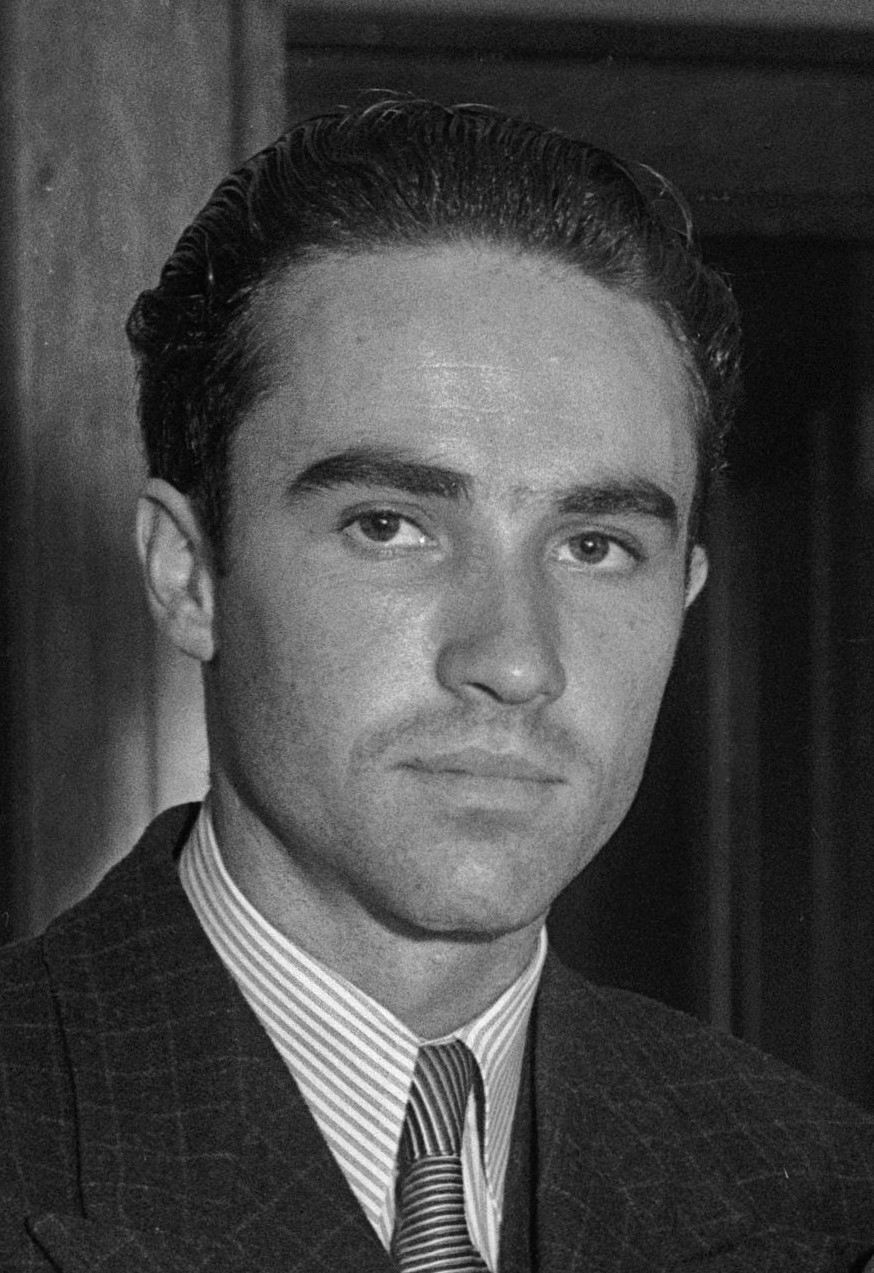
- Stephens in 1935

Senior Judge of the United States District Court for the Central District of California
- In office June 1, 1979 – September 6, 2001

Chief Judge of the United States District Court for the Central District of California
- In office 1970–1979
- Preceded by: Thurmond Clarke
- Succeeded by: Irving Hill

Judge of the United States District Court for the Central District of California
- In office September 18, 1966 – June 1, 1979
- Appointed by: operation of law
- Preceded by: Seat established by 80 Stat. 75
- Succeeded by: David Vreeland Kenyon

Judge of the United States District Court for the Southern District of California
- In office September 18, 1961 – September 18, 1966
- Appointed by: John F. Kennedy
- Preceded by: Benjamin Harrison
- Succeeded by: Seat abolished

Personal details
- Born: Albert Lee Stephens Jr. February 19, 1913 Los Angeles, California, U.S.
- Died: September 6, 2001 (aged 88) Mammoth Lakes, California, U.S.
- Parent: Albert Lee Stephens Sr. (father)
- Education: University of Southern California (A.B.); USC Gould School of Law (LL.B.)

Albert Lee Stephens Jr. (February 19, 1913 – September 6, 2001) was a United States district judge of the United States District Court for the Southern District of California and the United States District Court for the Central District of California.

== Education and career ==
Born February 19, 1913, in Los Angeles, California, the son of United States Circuit Judge Albert Lee Stephens Sr. and brother of California Court of Appeal Associate Justice Clarke E. Stephens, Stephens received an Artium Baccalaureus degree in 1936 from the University of Southern California and a Bachelor of Laws in 1938 from the USC Gould School of Law. He entered private practice in Los Angeles from 1939 to 1943. He was a United States Naval Reserve lieutenant from 1943 to 1946. He returned to private practice in Los Angeles from 1946 to 1959. He was appointed by Governor Pat Brown as Judge of the Los Angeles County Superior Court, serving from 1959 to 1961.

== Federal judicial service ==
Stephens was nominated by President John F. Kennedy on August 28, 1961, to a seat on the United States District Court for the Southern District of California vacated by Judge Benjamin Harrison. He was confirmed by the United States Senate on September 8, 1961, and received his commission on September 18, 1961. He was reassigned by operation of law to the United States District Court for the Central District of California on September 18, 1966, to a new seat authorized by 80 Stat. 75. He served as Chief Judge from 1970 to 1979. He assumed senior status on June 1, 1979. His service terminated on September 6, 2001, due to his death of heart failure in Mammoth Lakes, California, while on a fishing trip with former clerk and other friends.

=== Notable cases ===
Stephens supervised the large number of cases that arose from the 1969 Santa Barbara oil spill.

== Sources ==
Legal offices
Preceded by Benjamin Harrison	Judge of the United States District Court for the Southern District of California; 1961–1966	Succeeded by Seat abolished
Preceded by Seat established by 80 Stat. 75	Judge of the United States District Court for the Central District of California; 1966–1979	Succeeded by David Vreeland Kenyon
Preceded by Thurmond Clarke	Chief Judge of the United States District Court for the Central District of California; 1970–1979	Succeeded by Irving Hill
