= Debra Wong Yang =

American lawyer and judge from California

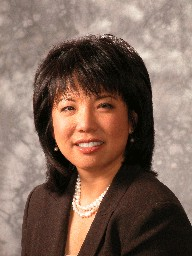

United States Attorney for the Central District of California
- In office May 20, 2002 – November 17, 2006
- President: George W. Bush
- Preceded by: Alejandro Mayorkas
- Succeeded by: Thomas P. O'Brien

Personal details
- Born: 1959 (age 66–67) Los Angeles, California, U.S.
- Party: Republican
- Education: Pitzer College (BA); Boston College (JD)

Debra Wong Yang (Chinese: 楊黃金玉; pinyin: Yáng Huáng Jīnyù) is the former United States Attorney for the Central District of California. She was appointed in May 2002 by President George W. Bush, who made her the first Asian American woman to serve as a United States Attorney. In 2009, Los Angeles Mayor Antonio Villaraigosa nominated Yang to a vacancy on the Los Angeles Police Commission. In 2016, she was listed as the potential choice for SEC Chief in Donald Trump's cabinet.

== Education ==
In 1981, Yang received a Bachelor of Arts degree from Pitzer College and in 1985, a Juris Doctor from Boston College Law School

== Career ==
Yang served as President of the Chinese American Museum in Los Angeles, where she played an instrumental role in the creation of this new landmark for Southern California. Yang was a founding member and officer of the first Asian American Bar Association in Chicago, and she has been an officer and board member of the Southern California Chinese Lawyer Association.

In 2002, the Los Angeles City Council honored her for her long-standing commitment to victims' rights. The Asian Pacific Bar Association selected her as the 2002 recipient of their Public Service Award. The National Asian Pacific American Bar Association selected her as the 2003 recipient of the Trailblazer Award. In 2004, she was appointed to the President's Council of Pitzer College of the Claremont Colleges, received Pitzer College's inaugural Distinguished Alumni Award, and was recognized by the Inglewood Court as a champion of civil rights.

Yang has been an adjunct professor at the USC Gould School of Law, where she taught trial advocacy. She has also been an instructor at the National Institute of Trial Advocacy and an instructor at California's Judicial College.

=== California state judge ===
Yang was a California state judge. She was appointed to the Los Angeles Municipal Court in 1997 and became a member of the Los Angeles Superior Court bench in 2000. As a judge, Yang acted as the Supervising Judge for the Hollywood Courthouse. She sat on the Criminal Law Advisory Committee and the Subcommittee on the Quality of Judicial Service for the Court's Judicial Council.

=== United States Attorney ===
Yang led the largest United States Attorney's Office outside of Washington, D.C. The office serves the approximately 18 million people who live in Los Angeles County, Orange County, Riverside County, San Bernardino County, Ventura County, Santa Barbara County and San Luis Obispo County, California.

Yang served as an Assistant United States Attorney for approximately seven years prior to her judicial career. As a federal prosecutor, she handled violent crimes, white-collar crimes, international money laundering, arson and computer crimes. As an Assistant United States Attorney, Yang successfully prosecuted a number of high-profile cases, including a Glendale arson investigator convicted of setting fires throughout the state of California; the first federal carjacking case in California; the kidnapping of a local real estate agent; and a computer hacker who received what was then the longest prison sentence for computer intrusion.

2006 dismissal of U.S. attorneys controversy
- Timeline
- Summary of attorneys
- Congressional hearings
- List of dismissed attorneys
- All related articles

Yang resigned her position as the United States Attorney for the Central District of California on November 11, 2006, to join Gibson, Dunn & Crutcher LLP. Senator Dianne Feinstein (D-CA) has raised questions about Yang's departure in light of the subsequent firing of seven US Attorneys. Yang's office had opened an investigation into the relationship between Rep. Jerry Lewis (R-CA) and a lobbyist five months before she left to join the law firm that represented Rep. Lewis. Yang has denied that any pressure was put on her to resign.

=== Los Angeles Police Commission ===
On August 13, 2009, Los Angeles Mayor Antonio Villaraigosa nominated Yang to a vacancy on the Los Angeles Police Commission. She will have a role in guiding the department past the end of the post-Rampart scandal consent decree and in selecting a new police chief to replace outgoing Chief William Bratton. Villaraigosa cited her "extensive law enforcement credentials" in making the selection.

=== Private law practice ===
After leaving the US Attorney's office, Yang became a partner at Gibson, Dunn & Crutcher’s Los Angeles office, becoming Co-Chair of the firm's Crisis Management Practice Group and the White Collar Defense and Investigations Practice Group.

== See also ==
- List of Asian American jurists
