= Philip S. Gutierrez =

American judge (born 1959)

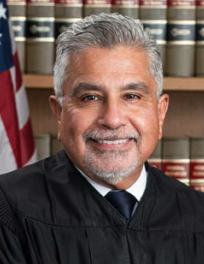

Chief Judge of the United States District Court for the Central District of California
- In office June 26, 2020 – March 30, 2024
- Preceded by: Cormac J. Carney
- Succeeded by: Dolly Gee

Judge of the United States District Court for the Central District of California
- In office February 16, 2007 – October 22, 2024
- Appointed by: George W. Bush
- Preceded by: Terry J. Hatter Jr.
- Succeeded by: Cynthia Valenzuela Dixon

Judge of the Los Angeles County Superior Court
- In office 1997–2007

Personal details
- Born: Philip Steven Gutierrez; October 13, 1959 (age 66) Los Angeles, California, U.S.
- Education: University of Notre Dame (BA); University of California, Los Angeles (JD)

Philip Steven Gutierrez (born October 13, 1959) is an American lawyer who is a former United States district judge of the United States District Court for the Central District of California.

== Early life and education ==
Gutierrez was born in Los Angeles. He received a Bachelor of Arts degree from the University of Notre Dame in 1981 and a Juris Doctor from UCLA School of Law in 1984. Gutierrez was in private practice in California from 1986 to 1997. He is of Mexican American descent.

== Judicial service ==
Gutierrez was a judge on the Los Angeles County Superior Court from 1997 to 2007. On January 9, 2007, Gutierrez was nominated by President George W. Bush to serve as a United States district judge of the United States District Court for the Central District of California. He was nominated to a seat vacated by Judge Terry J. Hatter Jr. He was confirmed by the United States Senate on January 30, 2007, and received his commission on February 16, 2007. He became chief judge on June 26, 2020, after Cormac J. Carney ended his short tenure as chief judge following controversy. Gutierrez's term as chief judge ended on March 30, 2024. He retired from active service on October 22, 2024.

=== Xbox modding case ===
Gutierrez heard the trial of Xbox modding defendant Matthew Crippen, a DMCA related case. Gutierrez criticized the prosecution after the federal government brought witnesses that illegally recorded Crippen and admitted to previously modifying Xbox consoles themselves. The government ultimately chose to dismiss the case, citing these issues with the witnesses presented in the early stages of the trial.

== See also ==
- List of Hispanic and Latino American jurists

Legal offices
Preceded by Terry J. Hatter Jr.	Judge of the United States District Court for the Central District of California; 2007–2024	Succeeded by Cynthia Valenzuela Dixon
Preceded by Cormac J. Carney	Chief Judge of the United States District Court for the Central District of California; 2020–2024	Succeeded by Dolly Gee
