= Thomas P. O'Brien =

American defense lawyer

Thomas Peter O'Brien
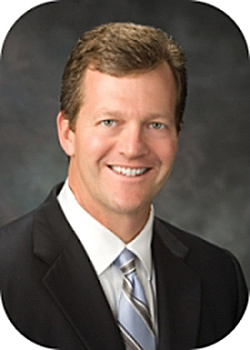

United States Attorney for the Central District of California
- In office October 5, 2007 – September 1, 2009
- President: George W. Bush; Barack Obama
- Preceded by: Debra Wong Yang
- Succeeded by: André Birotte Jr.

Personal details
- Born: Thomas Peter O'Brien; June 19, 1959 (age 67) Salem, Massachusetts, U.S.
- Education: United States Naval Academy (BS); University of San Diego School of Law (JD)
- Website: profile page

Military service
- Branch/service: United States Navy
- Years of service: 1981-c.1987

Thomas Peter O'Brien (born June 19, 1959) is an American white collar criminal defense lawyer at the Los Angeles law office of Ellis George Cipollone O’Brien Annaguey LLP. He was the United States Attorney for the Central District of California from October 2007 to September 2009.

== Education and military service ==
O'Brien graduated from the United States Naval Academy in 1981, where he earned his bachelor's degree, and from the University of San Diego School of Law in 1993, where he was an associate editor of the San Diego Law Review and received his degree with honors. He accumulated 2,000 flight hours as a radar intercept officer in the F-14 fighter aircraft, and is a graduate of the United States Navy Fighter Weapons School.

== Later life and legal career ==
After leaving the U.S. Navy, he landed a job as a stockbroker in October 1987. He left the business world after two years with that job.

O'Brien worked as deputy district attorney for Los Angeles County, California for more than five years in the gang unit. Before becoming United States Attorney, O'Brien served as chief of the Criminal Division in the United States Attorney's Office. In 2009, he oversaw the largest federal gang sweep in DOJ history, where 88 Hawaiian Gardens gang members were arrested. He is currently a litigation partner, where he focuses his practice on white collar defense and representing clients in federal investigations, at the Los Angeles law office of Ellis George Cipollone O’Brien Annaguey LLP. O'Brien was previously a partner at the Los Angeles office of Paul, Hastings, Janofsky & Walker.

== Controversies ==
=== Disbanding Of Public Corruption Unit ===
Shortly after taking office as the United States Attorney for the Central District of California, O'Brien disbanded the U.S. Attorney's office in Los Angeles whose target was corruption of public officials, elected officials, and other governmental regulators. O'Brien explained that the unit's 17 lawyers would be farmed out to other sections in the office.

=== Inquiry of Cardinal Roger Mahony ===
In 2009, O'Brien launched an inquiry of Cardinal Roger Mahony, the leader of the Roman Catholic Church's Los Angeles Archdiocese, which caused the Federal Grand Jury to take action. With the grand jury's inquiry came the possibility that Mahony would be held responsible for the many molestations that occurred by members of the clergy who the cardinal had reason to suspect were pedophiles. O'Brien was responsible for bringing the suit to light. There's a possibility that the "let's-move-on attitude might have gained traction were it not for U.S. Attorney Thomas P. O'Brien." The grand jury probe by O'Brien's office examined whether or not Mahony would be held accountable for leaving multiple sexual predators, including two convicted child molesters, serving in the ministry "until 2002 when a legal settlement in a clergy sexual abuse case mandated their removal." The suit was later dropped as it was filed under the honest services act, a law which is usually only applied to public officials and not members of the church.

=== Government expense account ===
O'Brien resigned as United States Attorney in September 2009. Shortly thereafter, an investigation by the U.S. Justice Department Inspector General uncovered that O'Brien stayed at pricey hotels while traveling and then sought government reimbursement by telling his secretary to lie and state falsely that more affordable rooms were not available. The report found that O'Brien's claims for reimbursement were "inappropriate and egregious" ethics violations. O'Brien denied telling his secretary to make false statements, but when interviewed by investigators he then blamed his secretary. Investigators found O'Brien's claims to be neither "credible or persuasive," the report said. O'Brien maintained his innocence.

However, as of November 2010, O'Brien made right with the case and has stated that "he didn't do anything wrong," but told the L.A. Times that he takes "full responsibility" for excessive spending caused by any errors. The former U.S. Attorney paid an amount of money to the Department of Justice to cover hotel bills the inspector general report identified as excessive.

== Awards ==
- Named Prosecutor of the Month in July 2000 by the Los Angeles County Association of Deputy District Attorneys.
- Received the 2007 Anti-Defamation League Pacific Southwest Region's Helene and Joseph Sherwood Prize for combatting hate.
- In October 2007, O'Brien received the Attorney General's Award for Exceptional Service, the Justice Department's highest award, for his role in successfully prosecuting four gang members who conspired to assault and murder African-Americans in the Highland Park neighborhood.
