= Eileen M. Decker =

American attorney

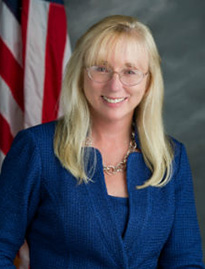

United States Attorney for the Central District of California
- In office June 29, 2015 – March 10, 2017
- President: Barack Obama; Donald Trump
- Preceded by: Stephanie Yonekura (acting)
- Succeeded by: Nicola T. Hanna

Personal details
- Party: Democratic
- Education: New York University (BA, JD); Naval Postgraduate School (MA)

Eileen M. Decker is an American attorney who served as the U.S. Attorney for the Central District of California from 2015 to 2017. Decker was nominated to join the Los Angeles Board of Police Commissioners in September 2018, where she became the president of the Board of Commissioners.

Decker serves as a lecturer at the USC Gould School of Law and previously taught Comparative Counterterrorism Law and Policy at the UCLA School of Law.

Decker practiced law at Gibson, Dunn & Crutcher for three years before working as a US Attorney.

== Education ==
- B.A. New York University, 1982
- J.D. New York University School of Law, 1990
- M.A. Naval Postgraduate School, 2014

== See also ==
- 2017 dismissal of U.S. attorneys
