= Benjamin Harrison (judge) =

American judge

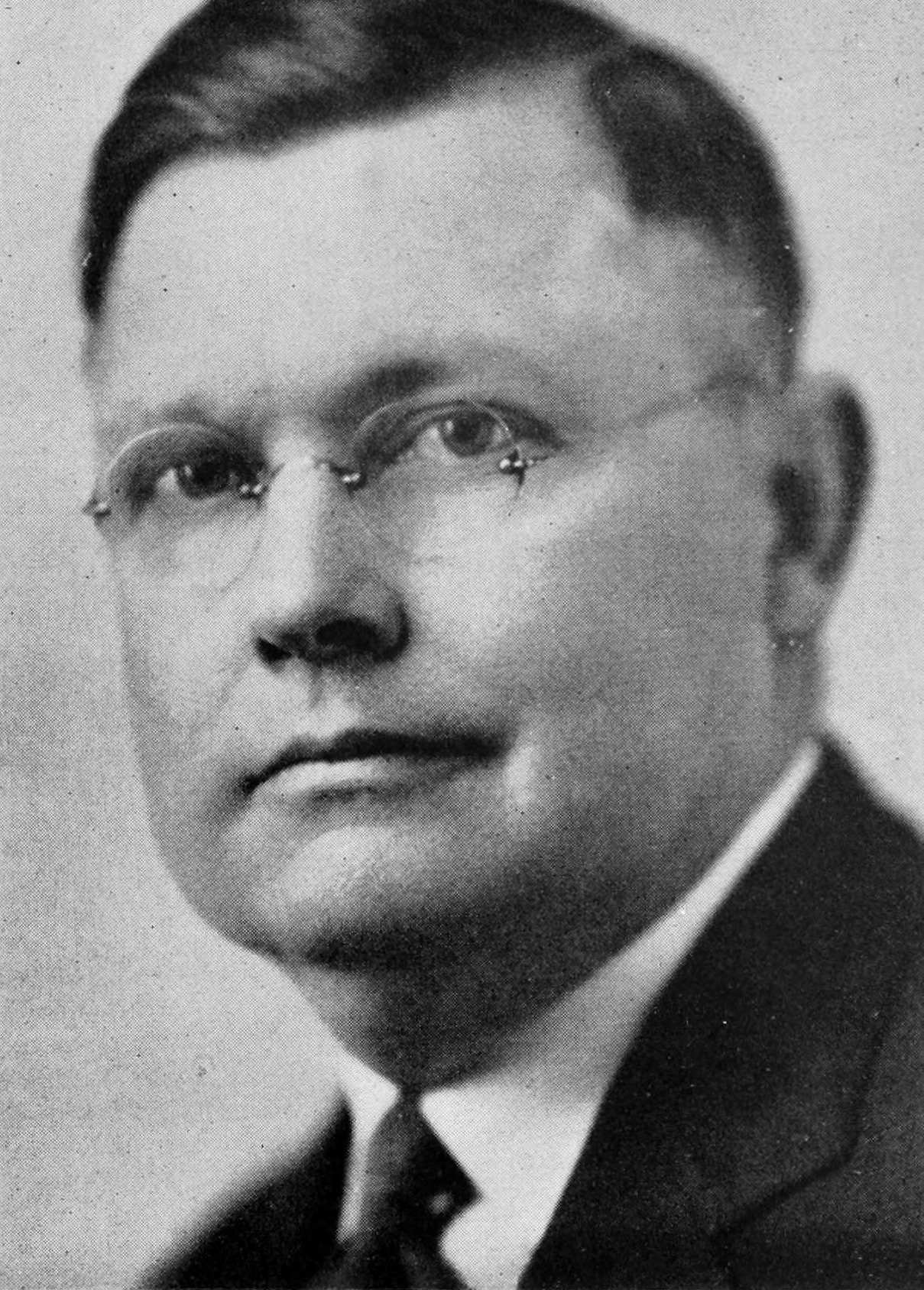
- Harrison c. 1940

Chief Judge of the United States District Court for the Southern District of California
- In office April 30, 1959 – August 7, 1959
- Preceded by: Leon Rene Yankwich
- Succeeded by: Peirson Mitchell Hall

Judge of the United States District Court for the Southern District of California
- In office June 26, 1940 – August 13, 1960
- Appointed by: Franklin D. Roosevelt
- Preceded by: Seat established by 54 Stat. 219
- Succeeded by: Albert Lee Stephens Jr.

Personal details
- Born: Benjamin Harrison; December 18, 1888 San Bernardino, California, U.S.
- Died: August 13, 1960 (aged 71)
- Education: read law

Benjamin Harrison (December 18, 1888 – August 13, 1960) was a United States district judge of the United States District Court for the Southern District of California.

== Education and career ==
Born in San Bernardino, California, Harrison read law to enter the bar in 1914. He was in private practice in Needles, California from 1917 to 1923, and in San Bernardino from 1923 to 1937, and was city attorney of Needles from 1918 to 1937. He was also a member of the Board of Education of San Bernardino from 1928 to 1932. He was the United States Attorney for the Southern District of California from 1937 to 1940.

== Federal judicial service ==
On June 11, 1940, Harrison was nominated by President Franklin D. Roosevelt to a new seat on the United States District Court for the Southern District of California created by 54 Stat. 219. He was confirmed by the United States Senate on June 22, 1940, and received his commission on June 26, 1940. He served as Chief Judge in 1959, and continued to serve on the court until his death on August 13, 1960.

== Sources ==
Legal offices
Preceded by Seat established by 54 Stat. 219	Judge of the United States District Court for the Southern District of California; 1940–1960	Succeeded by Albert Lee Stephens Jr.
Preceded by Leon Rene Yankwich	Chief Judge of the United States District Court for the Southern District of California; 1959	Succeeded by Peirson Mitchell Hall
