= Stanley Blumenfeld =

American judge (born 1962)

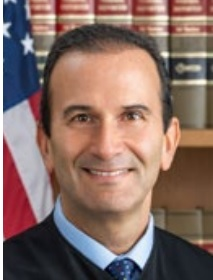

Judge of the United States District Court for the Central District of California
- Incumbent
- Assumed office September 18, 2020
- Appointed by: Donald Trump
- Preceded by: Audrey B. Collins

Judge of the Los Angeles County Superior Court
- In office June 20, 2006 – September 18, 2020
- Appointed by: Arnold Schwarzenegger
- Preceded by: John Sandoz
- Succeeded by: Wendy Wilcox

Personal details
- Born: March 7, 1962 (age 64) Patchogue, New York, U.S.
- Party: Republican
- Education: Binghamton University (BA); New York University (MA); University of California, Los Angeles (JD)

Stanley Blumenfeld Jr. (born March 7, 1962) is a United States district judge of the United States District Court for the Central District of California. He formerly served as a judge on the Los Angeles County Superior Court from 2006 to 2020.

== Education ==
Blumenfeld received his Bachelor of Arts from Binghamton University, a Master of Arts in Spanish from New York University in 1985, and his Juris Doctor from the University of California, Los Angeles in 1988, where he served as editor-in-chief of the UCLA Law Review and was inducted into the Order of the Coif.

== Career ==
Blumenfeld served as a law clerk to Judge Cynthia Holcomb Hall of the United States Court of Appeals for the Ninth Circuit from 1988 to 1989. He was an Assistant United States Attorney for the Central District of California from 1989 to 1993, and a Special Assistant United States Attorney from 1993 to 1996. He practiced at O'Melveny & Myers from 1993 to 2006, where he served as co-chair of the healthcare and environmental law practice groups. He is an adjunct professor at the University of Southern California School of Law, where he teaches a course in Constitutional criminal procedure and criminal remedies. From 2011 to 2014, he was an adjunct professor at Southwestern Law School.

=== State judicial career ===
Blumenfeld was appointed to the Los Angeles County Superior Court by Governor Arnold Schwarzenegger on June 20, 2006, to succeed John Sandoz. He was re-elected in 2014 for a term that expires in January 2021. In 2020, he was re-elected unopposed. His tenure on the state court ended when he became a federal judge.

=== Federal judicial service ===
On October 10, 2018, President Donald Trump announced his intent to nominate Blumenfeld to serve as a United States district judge of the United States District Court for the Central District of California. On November 13, 2018, his nomination was sent to the U.S. Senate. President Trump nominated Blumenfeld to the seat vacated by Judge Audrey B. Collins, who retired on August 1, 2014.

On January 3, 2019, his nomination was returned to the President under Rule XXXI, Paragraph 6 of the United States Senate. On January 30, 2019, President Trump announced his intent to renominate Blumenfeld to the district court. On February 6, 2019, his nomination was sent to the Senate. A hearing on his nomination before the Senate Judiciary Committee was held on November 13, 2019. On January 3, 2020, his nomination was once again returned to the President under Rule XXXI, Paragraph 6 of the United States Senate. On January 9, 2020, he was renominated to the same seat. On March 5, 2020, his nomination was reported out of committee by a voice vote. On September 15, 2020, the Senate invoked cloture on his nomination by a 89–6 vote. His nomination was confirmed later that day by a 92–4 vote. He received his judicial commission on September 18, 2020.

Legal offices
Preceded by John Sandoz	Judge of the Los Angeles County Superior Court; 2006–2020	Succeeded by Wendy Wilcox
Preceded by Audrey B. Collins	Judge of the United States District Court for the Central District of California; 2020–present	Incumbent
