= Robert Mitsuhiro Takasugi =

American judge

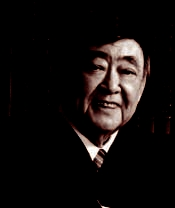

Senior Judge of the United States District Court for the Central District of California
- In office September 30, 1996 – August 4, 2009

Judge of the United States District Court for the Central District of California
- In office May 7, 1976 – September 30, 1996
- Appointed by: Gerald Ford
- Preceded by: Elisha Avery Crary
- Succeeded by: Carlos R. Moreno

Personal details
- Born: Robert Mitsuhiro Takasugi; September 12, 1930 Tacoma, Washington, U.S.
- Died: August 4, 2009 (aged 78) Los Angeles, California, U.S.
- Children: Judge Jon Takasugi and Leslie Takasugi
- Education: University of California, Los Angeles (B.S.); USC Gould School of Law (J.D.)
- Occupation: Judge
- Known for: First Japanese American federal judge

Robert Mitsuhiro Takasugi (Japanese: 高杉 光弘, September 12, 1930 – August 4, 2009) was a United States district judge of the United States District Court for the Central District of California.

== Early life ==
Takasugi was born in Tacoma, Washington. When he was 12 years old, he and his family were interned in the Tule Lake War Relocation Center, part of the World War II internment of 130,000 Japanese Americans resulting from the enforcement of Executive Order 9066. After the war, Takasugi attended Belmont High School in Los Angeles.

== Education ==
In 1953, Takasugi earned a Bachelor of Science degree from the University of California, Los Angeles. In 1959, Takasugi earned a Juris Doctor degree from the USC Gould School of Law.

== Career ==
Takasugi was a Corporal in the United States Army during the Korean War, from 1953 to 1955, acting as a criminal investigator for the Army. After law school, he entered private practice in Los Angeles, California from 1960 to 1973. He was a hearing examiner for the Los Angeles Police Commission from 1962 to 1965. He was appointed by Governor Ronald Reagan as a judge of the Los Angeles Municipal Court from 1973 to 1975, and elevated by Governor Jerry Brown to the Los Angeles County Superior Court from 1975 to 1976.

=== Federal judicial ===
On April 14, 1976, Takasugi was nominated by President Gerald Ford to a seat on the United States District Court for the Central District of California vacated by Judge Elisha Avery Crary. Takasugi was confirmed by the United States Senate on May 6, 1976, and received his commission the following day. Takasugi was the first Japanese American appointed as a federal judge. Takasugi assumed senior status on September 30, 1996, and took inactive senior status in April 2009.

== Personal life ==
Takasugi's wife was Dorothy Takasugi. They have two children. Takasugi is succeeded by his two children and grandchildren, Kinuyo Takasugi and Matthew Takasugi. On August 4, 2009, Takasugi died in Los Angeles, California.

== See also ==
- List of Asian American jurists

Legal offices
Preceded by Elisha Avery Crary	Judge of the United States District Court for the Central District of California; 1976–1996	Succeeded by Carlos R. Moreno
