= Terry J. Hatter Jr. =

American judge (born 1933)

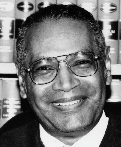

Senior Judge of the United States District Court for the Central District of California
- Incumbent
- Assumed office April 22, 2005

Chief Judge of the United States District Court for the Central District of California
- In office 1998–2001
- Preceded by: William Matthew Byrne Jr.
- Succeeded by: Consuelo Bland Marshall

Judge of the United States District Court for the Central District of California
- In office December 20, 1979 – April 22, 2005
- Appointed by: Jimmy Carter
- Preceded by: Seat established by 92 Stat. 1629
- Succeeded by: Philip S. Gutierrez

Judge of the Los Angeles Superior Court
- In office 1977–1980

Personal details
- Born: March 11, 1933 (age 93) Chicago, Illinois, U.S.
- Education: Wesleyan University (BA); University of Chicago (JD)

Terry Julius Hatter Jr. (born March 11, 1933) is a senior United States district judge of the United States District Court for the Central District of California.

== Education and career ==
Hatter was born on March 11, 1933, in Chicago. He received a Bachelor of Arts degree from Wesleyan University in 1954 and a J.D. degree from the University of Chicago Law School in 1960. He was a United States Air Force NCO-In-Charge from 1955 to 1956. He was an adjudicator for the United States Veterans Administration in Chicago from 1960 to 1961. Hatter was in private practice in Chicago from 1961 to 1962. He was an assistant public defender in Cook County, Illinois from 1961 to 1962. He was an Assistant United States Attorney of the Northern District of California from 1962 to 1966. He was a Special Assistant United States Attorney of Eastern District of California from 1965 to 1966. He was Chief Counsel of the San Francisco Neighborhood Legal Assistance Foundation from 1966 to 1967. He was regional legal services director of the Office of Economic Opportunity in San Francisco, California from 1967 to 1970. He was executive director of the Western Center on Law and Poverty in Los Angeles, California from 1970 to 1973. He was an associate clinical professor of law at the USC Gould School of Law from 1970 to 1974. He was a professor of law at Loyola Law School in Los Angeles from 1973 to 1975. He was a special assistant to the mayor and director of criminal justice planning in Los Angeles from 1974 to 1975. He was a special assistant to the mayor and director of urban development in Los Angeles from 1975 to 1977. Hatter was a judge of the Superior Court of California in Los Angeles County from 1977 to 1980.

=== Federal judicial service ===
Hatter was nominated by President Jimmy Carter on September 28, 1979, to the United States District Court for the Central District of California, to a new seat created by 92 Stat. 1629. He was confirmed by the United States Senate on December 19, 1979, and received his commission on December 20, 1979. He served as chief judge from 1998 to 2001. He assumed senior status on April 22, 2005.

== See also ==
- List of African-American federal judges
- List of African-American jurists
- List of United States federal judges by longevity of service

Legal offices
Preceded by Seat established by 92 Stat. 1629	Judge of the United States District Court for the Central District of California; 1979–2005	Succeeded by Philip S. Gutierrez
Preceded by William Matthew Byrne Jr.	Chief Judge of the United States District Court for the Central District of California; 1998–2001	Succeeded by Consuelo Bland Marshall
