= Sunshine Sykes =

American judge (born 1974)

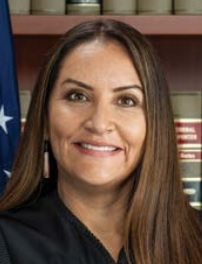

Judge of the United States District Court for the Central District of California
- Incumbent
- Assumed office June 14, 2022
- Appointed by: Joe Biden
- Preceded by: James V. Selna

Judge of the Riverside County Superior Court
- In office December 5, 2013 – June 14, 2022
- Appointed by: Jerry Brown
- Preceded by: Randall White
- Succeeded by: Magdalena Cohen

Personal details
- Born: Sunshine Suzanne Sykes; 1974 (age 51–52) Tuba City, Arizona, U.S.
- Party: Democratic
- Education: Stanford University (BA, JD)

Sunshine Suzanne Sykes (born 1974) is an American lawyer serving as a United States district judge of the United States District Court for the Central District of California. She previously served as a judge of the California Superior Court for Riverside County from 2013 to 2022.

== Early life and education ==
Sykes was born on the Navajo Nation Reservation in Tuba City, Arizona, and was raised in Gallup, New Mexico. She earned a Bachelor of Arts degree from Stanford University in 1997 and a Juris Doctor from Stanford Law School in 2001.

== Career ==
From 2001 to 2003, Sykes worked as a staff attorney for California Indian Legal Services. From 2003 to 2005, she was a contract attorney for the Defense Panel at the Southwest Justice Center. She also worked for the California Department of Social Services. From 2005 to 2013, Sykes served as deputy county counsel for Riverside County, California. In 2013, she was nominated by then-Governor Jerry Brown to serve as a judge on the Riverside County Superior Court.

== Federal judicial service ==
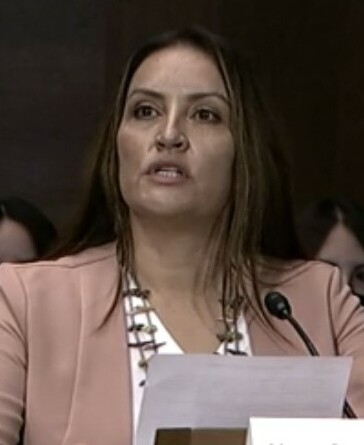
Sykes testifying before the Senate Judiciary Committee

On December 15, 2021, President Joe Biden nominated Sykes to serve as a United States district judge of the United States District Court for the Central District of California. President Biden nominated Sykes to the seat vacated by Judge James V. Selna, who assumed senior status on March 3, 2020. On February 1, 2022, a hearing on her nomination was held before the Senate Judiciary Committee. On March 10, 2022, her nomination was reported out of committee by a 12–10 vote. On May 17, 2022, the United States Senate invoked cloture on her nomination by a 51–45 vote. On May 18, 2022, her nomination was confirmed by a 51–45 vote. She received her judicial commission on June 14, 2022. Sykes became the fifth American Indian ever to serve on the federal bench.

== See also ==
- List of Native American jurists

Legal offices
Preceded by James V. Selna	Judge of the United States District Court for the Central District of California; 2022–present	Incumbent
