= Nicola T. Hanna =

American lawyer (born 1961)

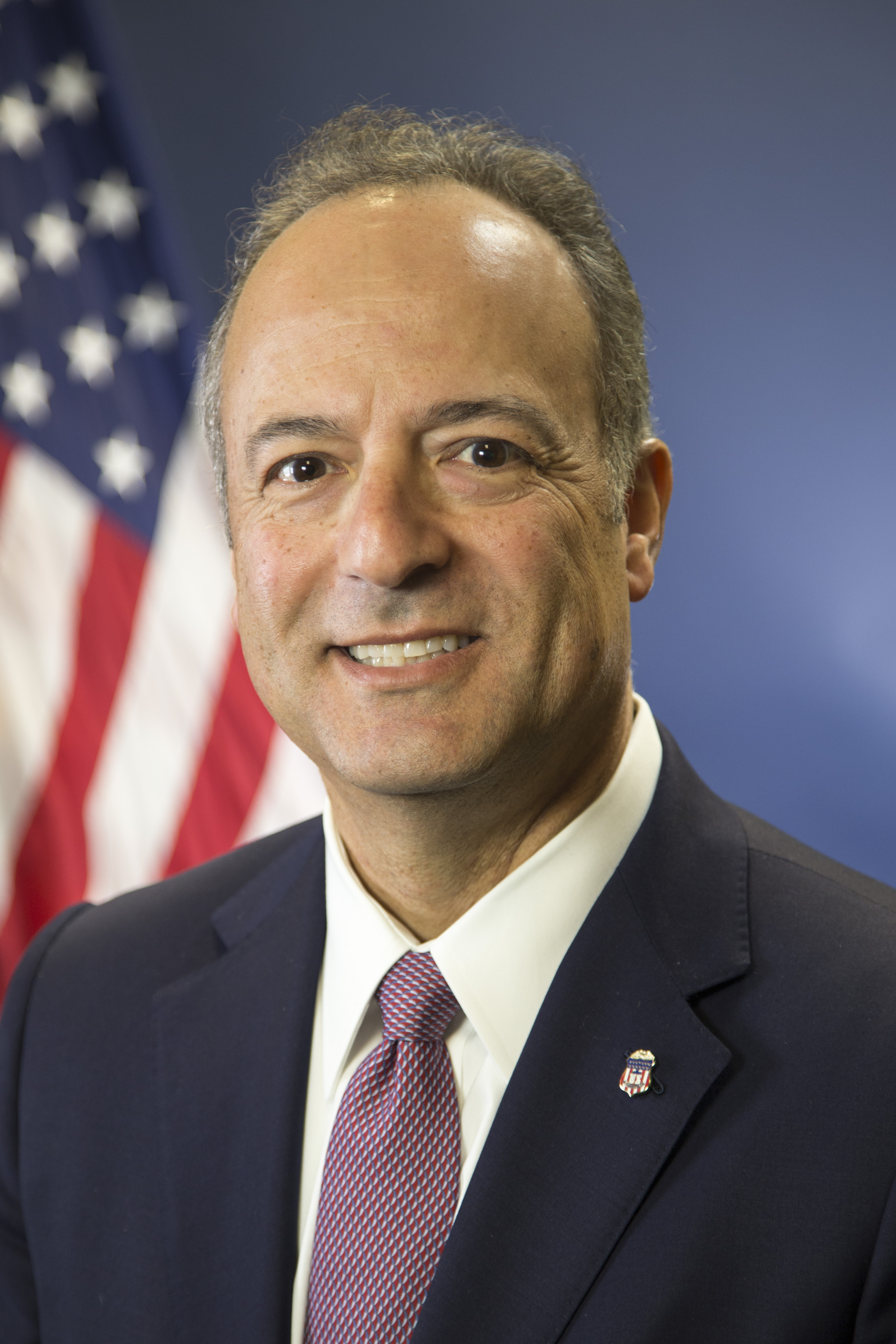

United States Attorney for the Central District of California
- In office January 5, 2018 – January 8, 2021; Interim: January 5, 2018 – April 26, 2018
- President: Donald Trump
- Preceded by: Eileen M. Decker
- Succeeded by: E. Martin Estrada

Personal details
- Born: Nicola Taisir Hanna; September 19, 1961 (age 65)
- Party: Republican
- Children: 3
- Education: University of California, San Diego (BA); Georgetown University Law Center (JD)

Nicola Taisir Hanna (born September 19, 1961) is an American lawyer who served as the United States Attorney for the Central District of California from 2018 to 2021.

== Early life and education ==
Hanna grew up in San Diego, California. His father Taisir was a businessman who immigrated from Ramallah, Palestine who came from an Antiochian Greek Christian family. He received his Bachelor of Arts from the University of California, San Diego and his Juris Doctor, magna cum laude, from Georgetown University Law Center.

== Career ==
Prior to becoming a U.S. Attorney, he was a partner at Gibson, Dunn & Crutcher, where he specialized in white-collar criminal matters and complex commercial litigation.

Hanna previously served as an Assistant United States Attorney in Los Angeles from 1990 to 1995, where he prosecuted major drug trafficking and money laundering organizations, as well as violent and economic crimes. From 1995 to 1998, he served as an Assistant United States Attorney in San Diego, where he focused on investigating and prosecuting international drug cartels.

=== U.S. attorney for the Central District of California ===
On February 16, 2018, President Donald Trump announced his intent to nominate Hanna to be the U.S. attorney for the Central District of California. On February 27, 2018, his nomination was sent to the Senate. On April 19, 2018, his nomination was reported out of committee by a voice vote. His nomination was confirmed by voice vote on April 26, 2018. On January 4, 2021, Hanna announced his resignation, effective January 8, 2021.
