= Ernest Allen Tolin =

American judge

Judge of the United States District Court for the Southern District of California
- In office October 30, 1951 – June 11, 1961
- Appointed by: Harry S. Truman
- Preceded by: Paul John McCormick
- Succeeded by: Elisha Avery Crary

Personal details
- Born: Ernest Allen Tolin; August 2, 1904 Pomona, California, U.S.
- Died: June 11, 1961 (aged 56)
- Education: Southwestern Law School (LL.B.)

Ernest Allen Tolin (August 2, 1904 – June 11, 1961) was a United States district judge of the United States District Court for the Southern District of California.

== Education and career ==
Born in Pomona, California, Tolin received a Bachelor of Laws from Southwestern University School of Law (now Southwestern Law School) in 1930. He was in private practice in Los Angeles, California from 1933 to 1941. He was a Special Attorney of the Antitrust Division of the United States Department of Justice in Los Angeles from 1942 to 1943. He was an Assistant United States Attorney of the Southern District of California from 1943 to 1946, serving as Chief Assistant United States Attorney from 1946 to 1949. He was the United States Attorney for the Southern District of California from 1949 to 1951. He was the lead prosecutor in United States v. Ingalls. This was the first case in the 20th century to use the Thirteenth Amendment, a Reconstruction era amendment which prohibited slavery and involuntary servitude.

== Federal judicial service ==
Tolin received a recess appointment from President Harry S. Truman on October 30, 1951, to a seat on the United States District Court for the Southern District of California vacated by Judge Paul John McCormick. He was nominated to the same seat by President Truman on March 3, 1952. He was confirmed by the United States Senate on June 10, 1952, and received his commission on June 11, 1952. Tolin served in that capacity until his death on June 11, 1961.

== Sources ==
Legal offices
Preceded by Paul John McCormick	Judge of the United States District Court for the Southern District of California; 1951–1961	Succeeded by Elisha Avery Crary
