= Qualcomm Inc. v. Broadcom Corp. =

Series of US Federal cases

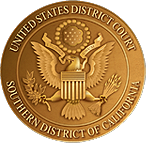
- Court: United States District Court for the Southern District of California
- Full case name: Qualcomm Inc. v. Broadcom Corp.
- Docket nos.: 3:05-cv-01958
- Citations: Qualcomm I, 539 F. Supp. 2d 1214 (S.D. Cal. Aug. 6, 2007); Qualcomm II, 2008 WL 66932, 2008 U.S. Dist. LEXIS 911 (S.D. Cal. Jan. 7, 2008); Qualcomm III, 2008 U.S. Dist. LEXIS 16897, 2008 WL 638108 (S.D. Cal. Mar. 5, 2008); Qualcomm IV, 2010 WL 1336937, 2010 U.S. Dist. LEXIS 33889 (S.D. Cal. Apr. 2, 2010)

Case history
- Related actions: 8:05-cv-00467; 8:05-cv-00468

Court membership
- Judge sitting: Rudi M. Brewster

Qualcomm Inc. v. Broadcom Corp. Qualcomm I - Qualcomm IV, was a series of US Federal cases between Qualcomm Inc. and Broadcom Corp. involving patent infringement and the duty to disclose patents to the JVT Standard Setting Organization and industry misconduct. Qualcomm held a relevant patent, but neglected to report it to the Standard Setting Agency until after it had made a ruling, and thus the point in question is if Qualcomm had waived its right to enforce its patent or not. The first of the series began in 2007 and ended in 2010.

Qualcomm II is the most significant of these cases because it makes the greatest deliberations on the question of enforceability in the case of unreported patents. This was the central point in question with these cases, the others being offshoots of this main theme.

== Background ==
Broadcom and Qualcomm both compete in the same mobile device chipset industry, such as those used in cell phones. This technology is available in what is classified as 3rd Generation, or 3G, processor chips. There were, and still are, two technology paths for this industry that are not compatible so companies subscribe to either one or the other; CDMA or GSM. Broadcom and Qualcomm subscribe to different technology paths, although the standards boards are closely connected and work for entire industry growth.

The two companies have different models of chips that are incompatible with each other and thus do not work together. Nonetheless, there is an industry standardization organization responsible for classifying patents and level of innovation for different generations. Qualcomm had acquired a certain patent that was relevant to both technology paths but neglected to inform either standard organization about it, waiting instead for new standards to be set. The aim of this move, according to litigators and the court, was to cause competing firms to unknowingly infringe on Qualcomm's patent so that they could seek damages and royalties, rather than bar direct usage.

== Cases ==
=== Qualcomm I ===
Qualcomm Inc. v. Broadcom Corp., 2007 U.S. Dist. LEXIS 57136 (S.D. Cal. Aug. 6, 2007)

A series of cases erupted as Qualcomm brought a suit against Broadcom for infringement. First in a 2007 Southern California district court, Qualcomm was ruled against on the grounds that they had mishandled reporting their patent. The court ruled that Qualcomm had waived its right to enforce the patent by these actions and found in favor of Broadcom.

=== Qualcomm II ===
Qualcomm Inc. v. Broadcom Corp., Qualcomm II, 2008 U.S. Dist. LEXIS 911 (S.D. Cal. Jan. 7, 2008)

The case was then taken to a US district court where Qualcomm appealed its case. This court examined Qualcomm's misconduct and what it described as "intentional and persistent insulation". Therefore, the court once more ruled in Broadcom's favor and ordered that Qualcomm could not enforce its patents in question, or any derivative of them.

The court affirmed the decision of the lower court, that Qualcomm had waived its right to enforce its patent since it failed to disclose it to a standards board it was willingly a part of.

=== Qualcomm III ===
Qualcomm Inc. v. Broadcom Corp., Qualcomm III, 2008 U.S. Dist. LEXIS 16897 (S.D. Cal. Mar. 5, 2008).

Although the court ruled largely in Broadcom's favor, they felt Qualcomm had avoided damages for obtaining a monopoly through its deceitful tactics. Therefore, Broadcom appealed the case to the US Court of Appeals, 3rd Circuit in 2008. In these deliberations, the court affirmed-in-part of their decision, but reversed-in-part another part specifically on further damages owed by Qualcomm for the effects of its misconduct and lack of adequate remedy. In addition to this ruling, the court determined that Qualcomm after having paid damages could now enforce its patents, and that the case should be remanded and heard in more deliberation.

The deliberations of the Court of Appeals, Federal Circuit in 2008 were much the same. Except that the court reversed the ruling on Qualcomm's enforceability, since it claimed the gross misconduct of Qualcomm was contrary to competition and the public interest.

=== Qualcomm IV ===
Qualcomm Inc. v. Broadcom Corp., Qualcomm IV, 2010 U.S. Dist. LEXIS 33889 (S.D. Cal. Apr. 2, 2010).

Qualcomm IV was the final case in the series and was different from the others in that it did not directly involve the patent infringement and enforceability question as before, but the legal misconduct of Qualcomm in the previous three cases. Specifically, legal experts from Broadcom discovered major errors, contradictions, and omissions in what Qualcomm had reported to the courts. They believed that it was malicious fraud intended to dilute the appeared impact of their actions and knowledge of such.

However, the court found through the evidence, that it was not any intended mistakes that caused the omissions and errors. It was through a series of unaccountable mishaps at several levels of Qualcomm's employees that led to them missing several key points that led them to believe they were not required to provide large sets of documents and evidence.

The court dismissed this case on the grounds that it was not due to any intended deception but rather basic negligence. However the court did not suggest or demand any follow up investigation into this matter.

The court initially recommended a program to manage legal protocol and aid in its investigation. When it arrived at its decision, however, it dismissed this plan. Although it did recommend such a program for future incidents similar to Qualcomm's.

== Decision ==
The final decisions made by the courts over the course of these cases were that Qualcomm waived its right to enforceability through its misconduct, and could not seek remedies for infringements before or even after the case. It had willingly been a part of a standard setting agency, and so the omission of its patent was grounds for dismissal of that patent.

== Significance ==
This was a major case in the world of patent law and innovation; it established the precedent that certain patents were simply unenforceable if an organization member omitted something of importance. It greatly increases the incentive to disclose information, especially for firms in industries with standards boards.

Secondly, it has also encouraged standards boards to create their own penalties and patent enforceability for similar situations that may arise in the future. Firms are not likely to want the same costly litigation that occurred in these cases, and thus a uniform code set by their standards board will help solve this. This therefore may lead to strengthened and more active standards boards.
