= Tilikum v. Sea World =

2012 US legal case on animal standing

Tilikum
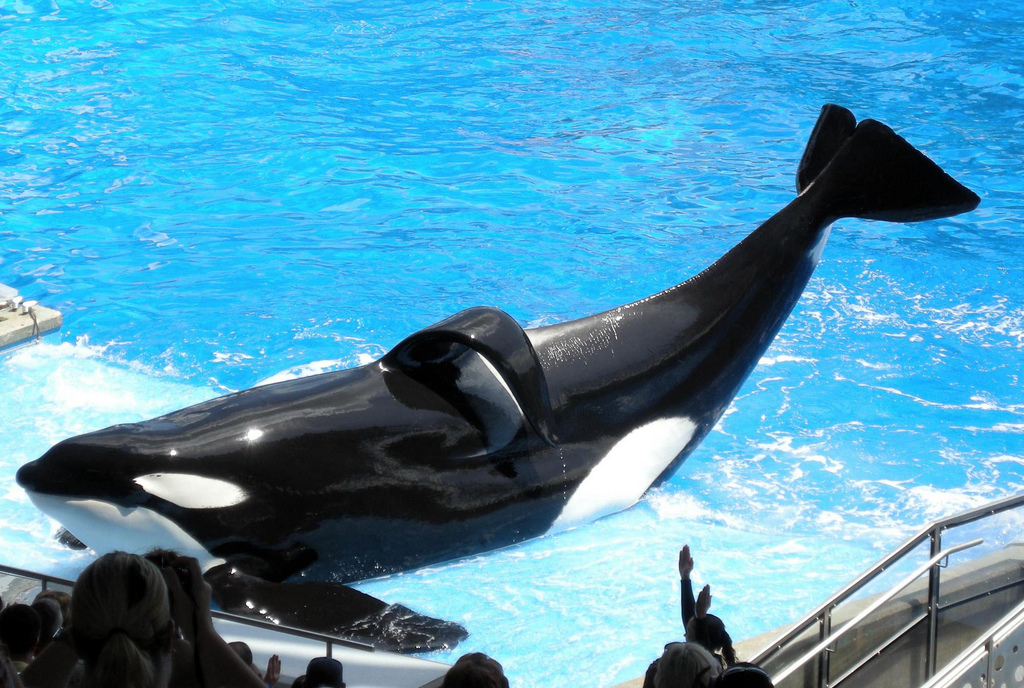
- Tilikum during a performance at SeaWorld Orlando in 2009
- Species: Orcinus orca
- Breed: Icelandic
- Sex: Male
- Born: c. December 1981
- Died: January 6, 2017 (age 35)
- Nationality: Iceland
- Employer: SeaWorld Orlando
- Weight: 12,000 lb (5,400 kg)

Tilikum v. Sea World
- Court: United States District Court for the Southern District of California
- Full case name: Tilikum, Katina, Corky, Kasatka, and Ulises, five orcas, by their Next Friends, People for the Ethical Treatment of Animals, Inc., Richard "Ric" O'Barry, Ingrid N. Visser, Ph.D., Howard Garrrett, Samantha Berg, and Carol Ray, Plaintiffs, v. Sea World Parks & Entertainment, Inc. and Sea World, LLC, Defendants
- Decided: February 8, 2012
- Citation: 842 F.Supp.2d 1259 (2012)

Tilikum v. Sea World (Tilikum et al. v. Sea World Parks & Entertainment Inc., 842 F. Supp. 2d 1259 (S.D. Cal. 2012)) was a legal case heard in the US Federal Court in 2012 concerning the constitutional standing of an orca. It was brought by People for the Ethical Treatment of Animals (PETA) on behalf of Tilikum, an orca kept in the SeaWorld Orlando park, against the SeaWorld corporation.

The plaintiff asked the court to rule that the terms of the Thirteenth Amendment to the United States Constitution applied to Tilikum, and thus that the orca's confinement amounted to involuntary servitude or slavery. The court held that the Thirteenth Amendment only applied to persons and that Tilikum was not a person, and so was not afforded constitutional protections.

== Background ==
Tilikum was a bull killer whale (Orcinus orca) bought by the SeaWorld marine park in Orlando, Florida in 1992 to be part of the park's orca exhibit. He was the largest orca in captivity. The other whales named as plaintiffs in the suit are Katina, who is also kept in Orlando, and Corky, Kasatka, and Ulises, who are kept at SeaWorld San Diego.

A year prior to the case, Tilikum killed his experienced handler and fellow performer, Dawn Brancheau. On February 24, 2010, Brancheau began her "Dine with Shamu" show with Tilikum as she had many times before. However, this show ended with Tilikum reacting poorly to Dawn's request. While Brancheau interacted with Tilikum before a live audience, he grabbed Brancheau and dragged her into the water. He held her at the bottom of the pool, ripping part of her scalp from her skull, breaking her jaw, fracturing vertebrae, removing her left arm, and killing her.

Tilikum was one of three orcas that killed trainer Keltie Byrne in 1991 at Sealand of the Pacific. Following the killing of Byrne, Tilikum and the other two orcas were put up for sale by the park. Tilikum was confined to a very small tank to keep him separate from the other two orcas, who had acted hostile towards him in the past. The three orcas were sold to SeaWorld Orlando. In 1999, the dead body of Daniel P. Dukes was found dead and injured, draped over Tilikum's back, after having snuck into the orca's tank after hours. Of the four human deaths captive orcas have caused, Tilikum was involved with three.

== Complaint ==
On October 25, 2011, animal rights organization PETA brought a constitutional lawsuit in the United States District Court for the Southern District of California as next friends of the orcas. They asserted the wording of the United States Constitution is not expressly limited to humans, and that orcas are entitled to protection under the 13th Amendment.

Neither slavery nor involuntary servitude, except as a punishment for crime whereof the party shall have been duly convicted, shall exist within the United States, or any place subject to their jurisdiction.

— Thirteenth Amendment

PETA stated that the whales "were born free and lived in their natural environment until they were captured and torn from their families". The complaint alleged the circumstances in which the whales were held resulted in them experiencing "extreme physiological and mental stress", and that their lifespans were shortened to "8.5 years in captivity versus up to 65 years in the wild". The lawsuit asked the court to rule that the orcas were held in illegal involuntary servitude.

SeaWorld called the action "baseless" and a "publicity stunt", and defended the treatment of orcas in its parks, saying "no facility sets higher standards in husbandry, veterinary care and enrichment" for orcas.

== The court’s decision ==
The court dismissed the action due to a lack of subject-matter jurisdiction. Dismissing the petition after two days of hearings, US District Judge Jeffrey T. Miller wrote "As 'slavery' and 'involuntary servitude' are uniquely human activities, as those terms have been historically and contemporaneously applied, there is simply no basis to construe the Thirteenth Amendment as applying to non-humans".
