= Todd Robinson =

Todd Robinson may refer to:

- Todd Robinson (ice hockey) (born 1978), Canadian professional ice hockey player
- Todd Robinson (film director), American film writer, director, and producer
- Todd D. Robinson (born c. 1963), American diplomat
- Todd W. Robinson (born 1967), American lawyer and jurist
