= Judge Nielsen =

Judge Nielsen of Nielson may refer to:

- Howard C. Nielson Jr. (born 1968), judge of the United States District Court for the District of Utah
- Leland Chris Nielsen (1919–1999), judge of the United States District Court for the Southern District of California
- William Fremming Nielsen (born 1934), judge of the United States District Court for the Eastern District of Washington
