= Monge v. Maya Magazines, Inc. =

- Court: United States Court of Appeals for the Ninth Circuit
- Full case name: Noelia Lorenzo Monge, Jorge Reynoso v. Maya Publishing Group, LLC; Maya Magazines, Inc.
- Argued: February 6, 2012
- Decided: August 14, 2012
- Citation: 688 F.3d 1164

Case history
- Prior history: Monge v. Maya Magazines, Inc., 2010 U.S. Dist. LEXIS 104352 (C.D. Cal., Sept. 30, 2010)

Holding
- District court judgement reversed and remanded.

Court membership
- Judges sitting: M. Margaret McKeown, Milan D. Smith Jr., Rudi M. Brewster

Case opinions
- Majority: M. Margaret McKeown, Rudi M. Brewster
- Dissent: Milan D. Smith Jr.

Laws applied
- 17 U.S.C. § 107

Monge v. Maya Magazines, Inc. 688 F.3d 1164 (9th Cir. 2012) is a copyright lawsuit where the court determined if the publication of previously unpublished photographs in a celebrity gossip magazine constitutes fair use. Latin American celebrities singer Noelia Lorenzo and music producer Jorge Reynoso claimed that Maya Publishing Group, LLC and Maya Magazines, Inc. infringed their copyrights by publishing previously unpublished photos of their secret wedding in their celebrity gossip magazine "TVNotas".

== Background ==
On January 3, 2007, Pop singer and model Noelia Lorenzo Monge and her manager, Jorge Reynoso, a music producer married in secret at the "Little White Wedding Chapel" in Las Vegas, Nevada. Only the two chapel employees and the minister witnessed the ceremony. The chapel employees assisted Monge in taking three wedding photos, which the couple intended for private use. Their wedding was kept hidden from the public and their families for two years.

Oscar Viqueira is a paparazzo, who worked as a bodyguard and driver for the couple while they visited Miami. In summer of 2008 Reynoso borrowed Viqueria's vehicle and left a memory chip in the ashtray when returning the vehicle. Viqueira opened the files inside the memory chip and found the photos of the wedding along with other photos and videos. After failing to use the photos to extort Reynoso for money he was owed, Viqueira sold the photos to Maya Magazines in February 2009 for $1,500. Maya published six of the photos on a two-page spread in Issue 633 of the magazine TVNotas with the headline "The Secret Wedding of Noelia and Jorge Reynoso in Las Vegas.". Prior to this the photos were unpublished and no permission was given by Monge or Reynoso for publication or selling of the photos.

Following the publication Monge and Reynoso registered copyrights in five out of six published photos and filed a complaint against Maya Magazines, Inc. asserting claims for common law misappropriation of likeness, copyright infringement, and statutory misappropriation of likeness. The district court struck the couple's claims for statutory damages under the Copyright Act and dismissed the misappropriation of likeness claims. The district court granted Maya's motion for summary judgment based on fair use under 17 U.S.C. § 107, and Maya's motion for attorney's fees and costs.

Monge and Reynoso appealed the decision.

== Opinion ==
M. Margaret McKeown wrote the majority opinion. In determining if a work is fair use the court considers the following factors under 17 U.S.C. § 107:

1. The purpose and character of the use, including whether such use is of a commercial nature or is for nonprofit educational purposes
2. The nature of the copyrighted work
3. The amount and substantiality of the portion used in relation to the copyrighted work as a whole
4. the effect of the use upon the potential market for or value of the copyrighted work.

For the first factor the court looked at three principles news reporting, transformation, and commercial use. The pictures at issue are newsworthy, but the magazine went beyond simply reporting uncopyrightable information and sought to exploit the headline value of its infringement. Maya did not transform the photos into a new work and Maya's minimal transformation of the photos substantially undercut by its undisputed commercial use. On balance Maya's claims are neutral, and does not support Maya's claim of fair use.

The Supreme Court's clear recognition that the unpublished status of the work is a "critical element" outweighing the fair use claim for the nature of the work in factor 2.

For the third factor the court looked at the quantitative and qualitative aspects of substantiality for the pictures. Quantitatively every photo from the wedding was published. The district court error in stating that only 6 out of 400 photos from the wedding were published. For the qualitative aspects because there was no modification or edits to the photos demonstrates that the "heart" of each individual copyrighted picture was published. Maya did not use a substantial amount of the photos, but performed a total appropriation, which weighs against fair use.

For the fourth factor the court examined the effect on the total market and determined that Maya's use curtailed both actual and potential market by having their publication function as a market replacement for the photos, which weighs against fair use

Maya has the burden to establish fair use without any of the factors in their favor. The district court erred by granting summary judgment in favor of Maya on the basis of fair use, therefore its decision is reversed and reprimanded.

=== Dissent ===
Judge Milan Smith wrote the dissenting opinion arguing the opinion being inconsistent with the Supreme Court precedent, and thwarts the public interests of copyright by allowing newsworthy public figures to control their images in the press. He argues that the ruling allows public figures to hide behind the cloak of copyright to prevent the news media from exposing their fallacies.

Smith disagreed with the ruling that the work was not transformative, since the photos were recontextualized for a different purpose adding something new, as evidence to prove a "controversial," "salacious," or controverted fact. For the second factor Smith argues that the photos were arrange in a stylized exposé using a montage of images with associated text changed the original character of the image. Third the photos were used for a different purpose, rather than document the wedding, the photos were used to criticize and expose the concealment of the Las Vegas wedding.

For the second factor Smith argues that the photos were factual in nature and cases where the content is transformative use, the nature of the work carries less significance.

For the third factor Smith argues that Maya only use 6 out of 300 pictures. Maya chose those pictures because they told the story of the couple's clandestine Las Vegas marriage. The photos were all on a fixed memory stick and purchased all at once. Maya's selective restraint in limiting the use of more photos is in favor of fair use.

Market failure is applied to the fourth factor since the couples intention to never publish the photo is in their own interest in spite of informing common public interest of the event. Market failure harm exception to the harm to potential and future markets militates toward a finding of fair use.
