= Judge Haight =

Judge Haight may refer to:

- Albert Haight, (1842–1926), judge, New York Court of Appeals
- Charles S. Haight Jr. (born 1930), American lawyer and federal judge for the United States District Court for the Southern District of New York
- Fletcher Mathews Haight (1799–1866), judge of the United States District Court for the Southern District of California
- Thomas Griffith Haight (1879–1942), judge of the United States Court of Appeals for the Third Circuit, in New Jersey
