= Thomas J. Whelan =

Thomas J. Whelan may refer to:

- Thomas J. Whelan (judge) (b. 1940)
- Thomas J. Whelan (mayor) (1922–2002)
