= Anthony Battaglia =

Anthony Battaglia may refer to:

- Anthony Battaglia (ice hockey) (born 1979), American ice hockey player
- Anthony J. Battaglia (born 1949), American federal judge
