= Edward J. Henning =

American judge

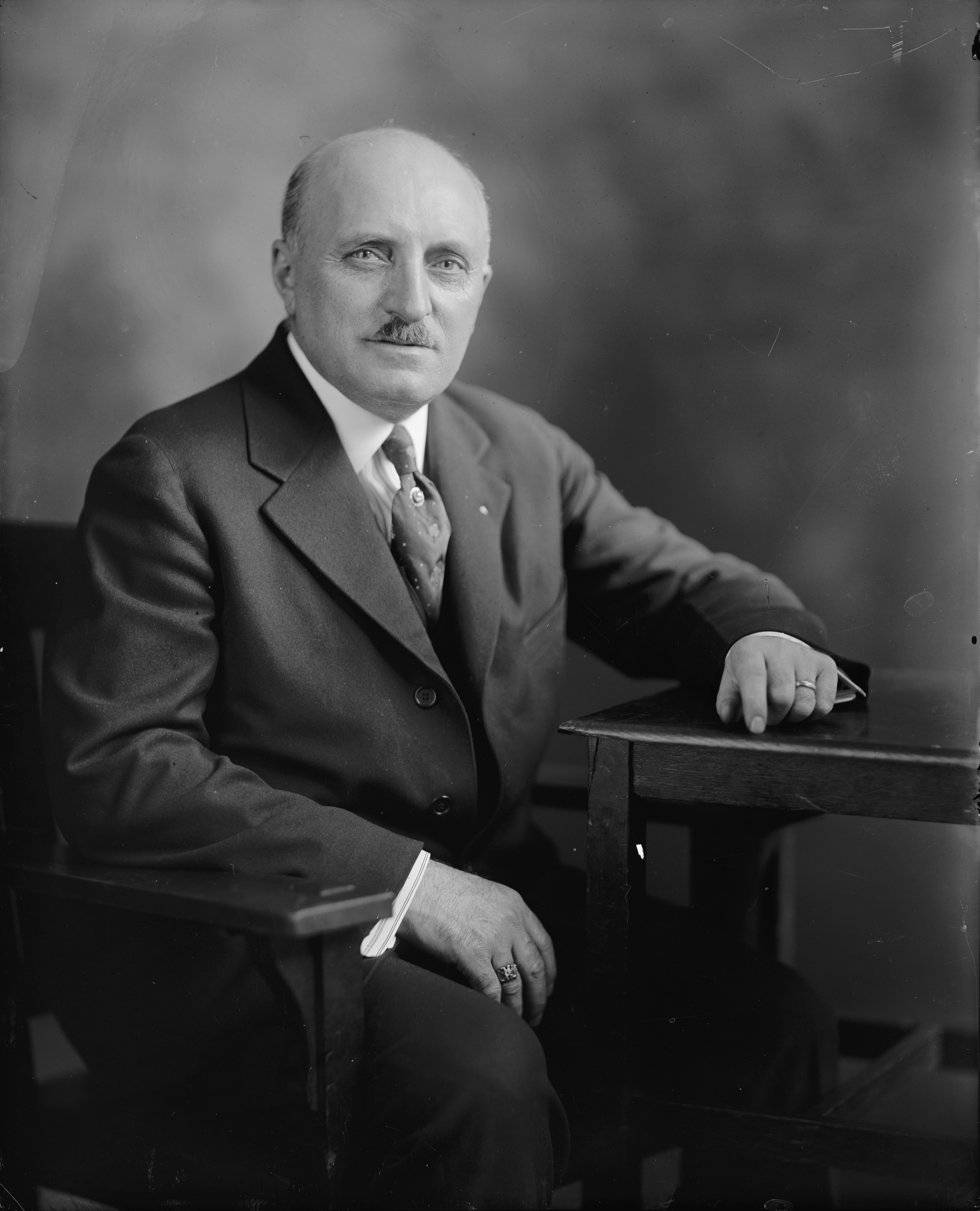

Judge of the United States District Court for the Southern District of California
- In office April 24, 1925 – December 31, 1929
- Appointed by: Calvin Coolidge
- Preceded by: Benjamin Franklin Bledsoe
- Succeeded by: George Cosgrave

Personal details
- Born: December 28, 1868 Iron Ridge, Wisconsin
- Died: September 6, 1937 (aged 68) Toledo, Ohio
- Education: University of Wisconsin–Madison (BL); George Washington University (LLB, LLM)

Edward J. Henning (December 28, 1868 – September 6, 1937) was a United States district judge of the United States District Court for the Southern District of California.

== Education and career ==
Born in Iron Ridge, Wisconsin, Henning received a Bachelor of Laws from the University of Wisconsin–Madison in 1894, a Bachelor of Laws from Columbian University School of Law (now George Washington University Law School) in 1896, and a Master of Laws from the same institution in 1897. He entered private practice in Milwaukee, Wisconsin in 1897, maintaining that practice until 1912, aside from service as the United States Attorney for the Eastern District of Wisconsin from 1901 to 1910. He was in private practice in San Diego, California from 1913 to 1921. He was an Assistant United States Secretary of Labor from 1921 to 1925.

== Federal judicial service ==
Henning received a recess appointment from President Calvin Coolidge on April 24, 1925, to a seat on the United States District Court for the Southern District of California vacated by Judge Benjamin Franklin Bledsoe. He was nominated to the same position by President Coolidge on December 8, 1925. He was confirmed by the United States Senate on December 15, 1925, and received his commission the same day. His service terminated on December 31, 1929, due to his resignation.

== Post judicial service and death ==
Following his resignation from the federal bench, Henning returned to private practice in Los Angeles, California, Washington, D.C., and New York City, New York from 1930 to 1937. He died on September 6, 1937, in Toledo, Ohio.

Legal offices
Preceded by Benjamin Franklin Bledsoe	Judge of the United States District Court for the Southern District of California; 1925–1929	Succeeded by George Cosgrave
