= Judith Keep =

American judge

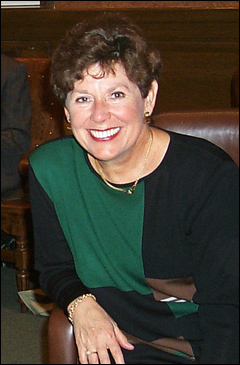

Chief Judge of the United States District Court for the Southern District of California
- In office 1991–1998
- Preceded by: Gordon Thompson Jr.
- Succeeded by: Marilyn L. Huff

Judge of the United States District Court for the Southern District of California
- In office June 30, 1980 – September 14, 2004
- Appointed by: Jimmy Carter
- Preceded by: Seat established by 92 Stat. 1629
- Succeeded by: Janis Lynn Sammartino

Personal details
- Born: March 24, 1944 Omaha, Nebraska, U.S.
- Died: September 14, 2004 (aged 60) San Diego, California, U.S.
- Education: Scripps College (BA); University of San Diego School of Law (JD)

Judith Nelsen Keep (March 24, 1944 – September 14, 2004) was a United States district judge of the United States District Court for the Southern District of California.

== Education and career ==
Born on March 24, 1944, in Omaha, Nebraska, Keep received a Bachelor of Arts degree in Humanities and Literature in 1966 from Scripps College. After graduation, she moved to San Diego and taught English at The Bishop's School in La Jolla. She received a Juris Doctor in 1970 from the San Diego School of Law (now the University of San Diego School of Law), graduating summa cum laude. She was a law clerk for Westgate-California, Inc. in 1970. She was an attorney with Defenders, Inc., in San Diego, California from 1971 to 1973. She was in private practice in San Diego from 1973 to 1976. She served as an Assistant United States Attorney in 1976. She served as a judge of the Municipal Court in San Diego from 1976 to 1980. In the 1970s, Keep organized a casual group with other female attorneys called the Old Girls Club.

== Federal judicial service ==
Keep was nominated by President Jimmy Carter on May 9, 1980, to the United States District Court for the Southern District of California, to a new seat authorized by 92 Stat. 1629. She was confirmed by the United States Senate on June 26, 1980, and received her commission on June 30, 1980. She served as Chief Judge from 1991 to 1998. Her service terminated on September 14, 2004, due to her death in San Diego.

Keep was the first female federal judge in her district and the first female Chief Judge of the district. As a member of the Judicial Conference of the United States (JCUS), Judge Keep represented the Ninth Circuit District Judges at the JCUS from 1999 to 2002. She also was appointed by Chief Justice William Rehnquist to the Defender Services Committee of the JCUS in 1998 and served through 2004. Her court handled many drug and immigrant smuggling cases. Keep made a significant contribution to court governance as a member of the Judicial Council of the Ninth Circuit for eight years. She first represented the chief district judges from 1994 to 1997. Her service to the council continued as president of the District Judges Association from 1997 to 1999, and then as the district judges’ representative to the JCUS from 1999 to 2002. Other service to the Ninth Circuit included chairing the Task Force on Judicial Wellness, which paved the way for groundbreaking efforts to promote health and wellness among judges, and the Federal Court Study Committee.

== Death and legacy ==
Keep died of cancer on September 14, 2004, in San Diego. Every September since 2005, the San Diego Chapter of the Federal Bar Association has hosted a half-day federal civil practice seminar in Keep's name. In a March 30, 2015, ceremony, the new federal courthouse in San Diego was named the James M. Carter and Judith N. Keep United States Courthouse to honor her and another federal judge. She is survived by her loving husband, Russell Block, and many dear friends and family in San Diego.

Legal offices
Preceded by Seat established by 92 Stat. 1629	Judge of the United States District Court for the Southern District of California; 1980–2004	Succeeded by Janis Lynn Sammartino
Preceded by Gordon Thompson Jr.	Chief Judge of the United States District Court for the Southern District of California; 1991–1998	Succeeded by Marilyn L. Huff
