= John Skylstead Rhoades Sr. =

American judge

Senior Judge of the United States District Court for the Southern District of California
- In office November 4, 1995 – September 3, 2007

Judge of the United States District Court for the Southern District of California
- In office October 28, 1985 – November 4, 1995
- Appointed by: Ronald Reagan
- Preceded by: Leland Chris Nielsen
- Succeeded by: Thomas J. Whelan

Personal details
- Born: John Skylstead Rhoades Sr. March 18, 1925 Havre, Montana
- Died: September 3, 2007 (aged 82) San Diego, California
- Education: Stanford University (A.B.); University of California, Hastings; College of the Law (J.D.)

John Skylstead Rhoades Sr. (March 18, 1925 – September 3, 2007) was a United States district judge of the United States District Court for the Southern District of California.

== Education and career ==
Born in Havre, Montana, Rhoades was in the United States Navy during World War II, from 1943 to 1946. He received an Artium Baccalaureus degree from Stanford University in 1948 and a Juris Doctor from the University of California, Hastings College of the Law in 1951. He was in the United States Navy Reserve following World War II, from 1946 to 1966. He was a prosecuting attorney of San Diego, California from 1955 to 1956. He was a deputy city attorney of San Diego from 1956 to 1957. He was in private practice in San Diego from 1957 to 1985.

== Federal judicial service ==
Rhoades was nominated by President Ronald Reagan on September 27, 1985, to a seat on the United States District Court for the Southern District of California vacated by Judge Leland Chris Nielsen. He was confirmed by the United States Senate on October 25, 1985, and received his commission on October 28, 1985. He assumed senior status on November 4, 1995. Rhoades served in that capacity until September 3, 2007, when he died in San Diego while in the hospital recovering from heart surgery the previous June.

== Sources ==
Legal offices
Preceded by Leland Chris Nielsen	Judge of the United States District Court for the Southern District of California; 1985–1995	Succeeded by Thomas J. Whelan
