= Laura Duffy =

American lawyer

Laura E. Duffy
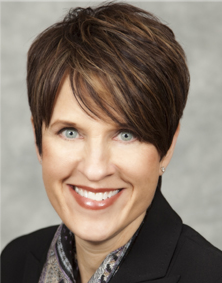

U.S. Attorney for the Southern District of California
- In office May 2010 – January 6, 2017
- Appointed by: Barack Obama
- Preceded by: Karen Hewitt
- Succeeded by: Robert S. Brewer Jr.

Personal details
- Born: 1962 (age 63–64) Des Moines, Iowa, U.S.
- Party: Democratic
- Spouse: Keri Davis
- Education: Iowa State University (BS); Creighton University School of Law (JD)

Laura Elizabeth Duffy (born 1962) is an American lawyer and judge who serves on the San Diego County Superior Court and served as the United States Attorney for the Southern District of California from 2010 to 2017.

== Early life and education ==
Born in Des Moines, Iowa, Duffy attended Northwest Missouri State University and the University of Iowa before graduating from Iowa State University with a Bachelor of Science degree. She earned her Juris Doctor from Creighton University School of Law in Omaha, Nebraska. As a law student at Creighton, she worked as a law clerk in the Douglas County, Nebraska Public Defender's Office.

== Professional career ==
Duffy joined the Criminal Division of the U.S. Department of Justice as a trial attorney in 1993, working first for the Money Laundering Section and then for the Narcotics and Dangerous Drug Section. In 1997, she moved to the U.S. Attorney’s Office for the Southern District of California, with the rank of Assistant United States Attorney. There, she served in the Narcotics Enforcement Section until being promoted in 2007 to the position of Deputy Chief of the General Crimes Section. She is best known for her prosecution of members of the Arellano-Felix drug cartel.

On February 24, 2010, Duffy was nominated by President Barack Obama to serve as U.S. Attorney for the Southern District, which covers San Diego and Imperial counties. The Senate Judiciary Committee approved her nomination unanimously on May 27, 2010; she gained unanimous approval from the full Senate the following day.

In October 2011, she joined with the three other U.S. Attorneys from California to announce a controversial crackdown on medical marijuana dispensaries, which are permitted under California state law but not under federal law.

In December 2016, she was appointed to San Diego County Superior Court by then-Governor Jerry Brown.

== Personal ==
Duffy is a lesbian; she is married to Keri Davis, with whom she has one child. At the time of her appointment she was one of four openly LGBT U.S. Attorneys, alongside Jenny Durkan of the Western District of Washington, Anne Tompkins of the Western District of North Carolina, and Robert L. Pitman of the Western District of Texas.
