= Janis Lynn Sammartino =

American judge (born 1950)

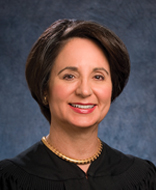

Judge of the United States District Court for the Southern District of California
- Incumbent
- Assumed office September 21, 2007
- Appointed by: George W. Bush
- Preceded by: Judith Keep

Personal details
- Born: April 24, 1950 (age 75) Philadelphia, Pennsylvania, U.S.
- Education: Occidental College (BA); University of Notre Dame (JD)

Janis Lynn Sammartino (born April 24, 1950) is a United States district judge of the United States District Court for the Southern District of California.

== Early life and education ==
Sammartino was born in Philadelphia. She graduated from Occidental College with a Bachelor of Arts degree in 1972 and later from Notre Dame Law School at the University of Notre Dame with a Juris Doctor in 1975.

== Legal career ==
Following law school graduation, Sammartino worked as a law clerk for St. Joseph County Superior Court Judge Douglas Seely from 1975 to 1976. She was a deputy city attorney of San Diego City Attorney's Office from 1976 to 1994. Sammartino was a judge on the San Diego Municipal Court from 1994 to 1995. She was a judge on the San Diego County Superior Court from 1995 to 2007.

== Judicial career ==
Sammartino was nominated to the United States District Court for the Southern District of California by President George W. Bush on March 19, 2007, to a seat vacated by the death of Judge Judith Keep. She was confirmed by the Senate on September 10, 2007, on a 99–0 vote and received her commission on September 21, 2007.

=== Notable cases ===
On May 17, 2017, Sammartino sentenced Rear Admiral Robert Gilbeau, the first active duty admiral ever convicted of a felony, to 18 months in prison for his involvement in the Fat Leonard scandal, although Gilbeau will still be allowed to continue collecting his nearly $10,000 monthly pension.

== Sources ==
Legal offices
Preceded by Judith Keep	Judge of the United States District Court for the Southern District of California; 2007–present	Incumbent
