= M. James Lorenz =

American judge (born 1935)

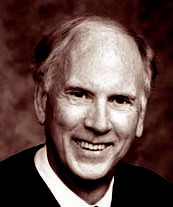

Senior Judge of the United States District Court for the Southern District of California
- Incumbent
- Assumed office October 25, 2009

Judge of the United States District Court for the Southern District of California
- In office October 5, 1999 – October 25, 2009
- Appointed by: Bill Clinton
- Preceded by: Rudi M. Brewster
- Succeeded by: Anthony J. Battaglia

United States Attorney for the Southern District of California
- In office 1980–1981
- President: Jimmy Carter
- Preceded by: Michael J. Walsh
- Succeeded by: William H. Kennedy

Personal details
- Born: Myron James Lorenz; October 13, 1935 (age 90) Pasadena, California, U.S.
- Education: University of California at Berkeley (BA); California Western School of Law (JD)

Military service
- Branch/service: United States Marine Corps; United States Marine Corps Reserve
- Years of service: 1957-1960

Myron James Lorenz (born October 13, 1935) is a senior United States district judge of the United States District Court for the Southern District of California.

== Early life and education ==
Born in Pasadena, California, Lorenz received a Bachelor of Arts degree from the University of California at Berkeley in 1957 and a Juris Doctor from California Western School of Law in 1965, where he was a member of the Campbell E. Beaumont chapter of Phi Alpha Delta.

== Career and military service ==
Lorenz was a Deputy district attorney of San Diego County District Attorney's Office, from 1966 to 1978. He was an Assistant United States Attorney for the Southern District of California from 1978 to 1981. He was First Assistant United States Attorney from 1978 to 1980. He was a Court appointed United States Attorney from 1980 to 1981. He was in private practice in San Diego from 1982 to 1999. He served in the United States Marine Corps from 1957 to 1960 and in the United States Marine Corps Reserve.

== Federal judicial service ==
Lorenz is a United States District Judge of the United States District Court for the Southern District of California. Lorenz was nominated by President Bill Clinton on March 8, 1999, to a seat vacated by Rudi M. Brewster. He was confirmed by the United States Senate on October 1, 1999, and received commission on October 5, 1999. He assumed senior status on October 25, 2009.

Legal offices
Preceded by Rudi M. Brewster	Judge of the United States District Court for the Southern District of California; 1999–2009	Succeeded by Anthony J. Battaglia
