= Isaac Stockton Keith Ogier =

American judge

Judge of the United States District Court for the Southern District of California
- In office January 23, 1854 – May 21, 1861
- Appointed by: Franklin Pierce
- Preceded by: Seat established by 10 Stat. 265
- Succeeded by: Fletcher Mathews Haight

Personal details
- Born: Isaac Stockton Keith Ogier; July 27, 1819 Charleston, South Carolina
- Died: May 21, 1861 (aged 41) San Bernardino County, California
- Education: read law

Isaac Stockton Keith Ogier (July 27, 1819 – May 21, 1861) was a United States district judge of the United States District Court for the Southern District of California.

== Education and career ==
Born in Charleston, South Carolina, Ogier read law to enter the bar in 1845. He was in private practice briefly in Charleston, and then in New Orleans, Louisiana from 1845 to 1846.

He served in Company H, 4th Louisiana Militia Infantry Regiment, known as the Montezuma Regiment, from 1846 to 1848 and became a captain.

He then returned to private practice in New Orleans from 1848 to 1849. He moved his practice to San Joaquin, California from 1849 to 1850, and was at the same time a member of the California State Assembly. He then relocated to Los Angeles, California, practicing there from 1850 to 1852, and serving as district attorney for Los Angeles County, California from 1851 to 1852. He was the United States Attorney for the Southern District of California from 1853 to 1854.

== Federal judicial service ==
On January 18, 1854, Ogier was nominated by President Franklin Pierce to a new seat on the United States District Court for the Southern District of California created by 10 Stat. 265. He was confirmed by the United States Senate on January 23, 1854, and received his commission the same day. Ogier served in that capacity until his death on May 21, 1861, in San Bernardino County, California.

== Sources ==
Legal offices
Preceded by Seat established by 10 Stat. 265	Judge of the United States District Court for the Southern District of California; 1854–1861	Succeeded by Fletcher Mathews Haight
