= Charles Hardy Carr =

American judge (1903–1976)

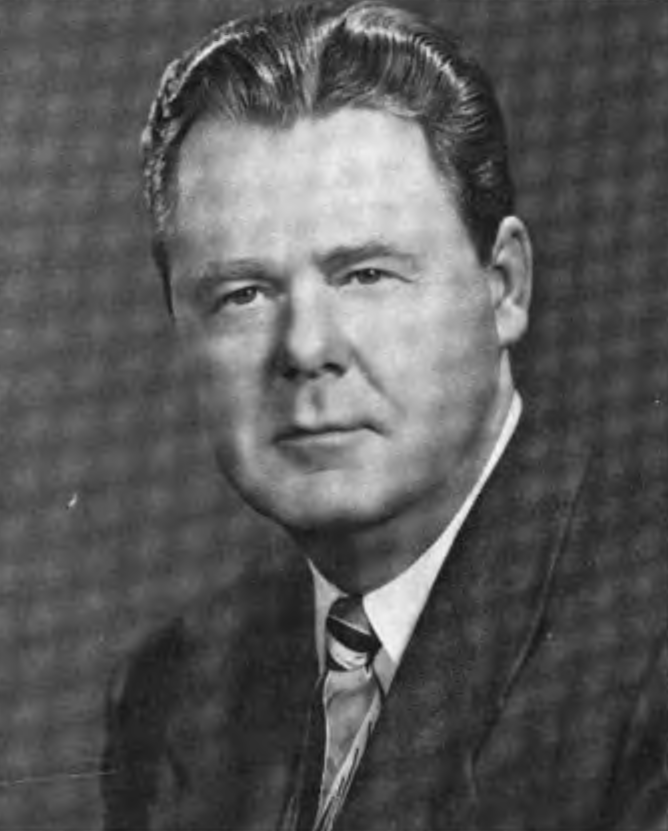

Senior Judge of the United States District Court for the Central District of California
- In office August 18, 1973 – March 13, 1976

Judge of the United States District Court for the Central District of California
- In office September 18, 1966 – August 18, 1973
- Appointed by: operation of law
- Preceded by: Seat established by 80 Stat. 75
- Succeeded by: Robert Firth

Judge of the United States District Court for the Southern District of California
- In office August 14, 1962 – September 18, 1966
- Appointed by: John F. Kennedy
- Preceded by: Seat established by 75 Stat. 80
- Succeeded by: Seat abolished

Personal details
- Born: Charles Hardy Carr; August 18, 1903 Coahoma, Mississippi
- Died: March 13, 1976 (aged 72)
- Education: Vanderbilt University (A.B.); Yale Law School (LL.B.)

Charles Hardy Carr (August 18, 1903 – March 13, 1976) was a United States district judge of the United States District Court for the Southern District of California and the United States District Court for the Central District of California.

== Education and career ==
Born in Coahoma, Mississippi, Carr received an Artium Baccalaureus degree from Vanderbilt University in 1925 and a Bachelor of Laws from Yale Law School in 1926. He was in private practice in Memphis, Tennessee from 1926 to 1929. He was an instructor at Southwestern University in Los Angeles, California from 1930 to 1931, thereafter returning to private practice in Los Angeles from 1931 to 1933. He was an Assistant United States Attorney in the Southern District of California from 1933 to 1936, and then a special assistant to the United States Attorney General until 1940. He was again in private practice in Los Angeles from 1940 to 1943. He was the United States Attorney for the Southern District of California from 1943 to 1946. He was in private practice in Los Angeles from 1946 to 1962.

== Federal judicial service ==
Carr was nominated by President John F. Kennedy on July 12, 1962, to the United States District Court for the Southern District of California, to a new seat authorized by 75 Stat. 80. He was confirmed by the United States Senate on August 9, 1962, and received his commission on August 14, 1962. He was reassigned by operation of law on September 18, 1966, to the United States District Court for the Central District of California, to a new seat authorized by 80 Stat. 75. He assumed senior status on August 18, 1973. His service terminated on March 13, 1976, due to his death.

== Sources ==
Legal offices
Preceded by Seat established by 75 Stat. 80	Judge of the United States District Court for the Southern District of California; 1962–1966	Succeeded by Seat abolished
Preceded by Seat established by 80 Stat. 75	Judge of the United States District Court for the Central District of California; 1966–1973	Succeeded by Robert Firth
