= Consuelo Bland Marshall =

American judge (born 1936)

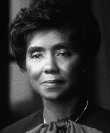

Senior Judge of the United States District Court for the Central District of California
- Incumbent
- Assumed office October 24, 2005

Chief Judge of the United States District Court for the Central District of California
- In office 2001–2005
- Preceded by: Terry J. Hatter Jr.
- Succeeded by: Alicemarie Huber Stotler

Judge of the United States District Court for the Central District of California
- In office September 30, 1980 – October 24, 2005
- Appointed by: Jimmy Carter
- Preceded by: Robert Firth
- Succeeded by: Valerie Baker Fairbank

Judge for the Criminal Division of the Los Angeles County Superior Court
- In office 1977–1980

Judge for the Civil and Criminal Division of the Inglewood Municipal Court
- In office 1976–1977

Commissioner of the Juvenile Court of the Los Angeles County Superior Court
- In office 1971–1976

Personal details
- Born: Consuelo Bland Arnold; September 28, 1936 (age 89) Knoxville, Tennessee, U.S.
- Spouse: George E. Marshall
- Children: Laurie Grindle
- Education: Los Angeles City College (AA); Howard University (BA, LLB)

Consuelo Bland Marshall (born September 28, 1936) is a senior United States district judge of the United States District Court for the Central District of California.

== Education and career ==
Born in Knoxville, Tennessee, Marshall received an Associate of Arts degree from Los Angeles City College in 1956. She received a Bachelor of Arts degree from Howard University in 1958. She received a Bachelor of Laws from Howard University School of Law in 1961. She was a deputy city attorney of Los Angeles City Attorney's Office from 1962 to 1967. She was in private practice of law in Los Angeles, California from 1968 to 1970. She was a Commissioner of the Juvenile Court of the Los Angeles County Superior Court from 1971 to 1976. She was a judge of the Civil and Criminal Division of the Inglewood Municipal Court in Inglewood, California from 1976 to 1977. She was a judge of the Criminal Division of the Los Angeles County Superior Court from 1977 to 1980.

=== Federal judicial service ===
Marshall was nominated by President Jimmy Carter on June 20, 1980, to a seat on the United States District Court for the Central District of California vacated by Judge Robert Firth. She was confirmed by the United States Senate on September 29, 1980, and received her commission on September 30, 1980. She served as the first woman and first African-american woman Chief Judge from 2001 to 2005. She assumed senior status on October 24, 2005.

=== Landmark rulings ===
A notable decision was rendered by Judge Marshall in the matter Preferred Communications Inc. v. City of Los Angeles.

The United States Court of Appeals for the Ninth Circuit and later the U.S. Supreme Court found that the City of Los Angeles violated the First Amendment through its procedure relative to the South Central Los Angeles Cable Television Franchise specifically by depriving Preferred Communications Inc. access to the public utility lines.

Marshal would dismiss the case twice; and, twice, Marshall was reversed, in two higher courts. In sum, twelve senior members of the bench superseded Marshall's dismissal of the case; three judges from the 9th Circuit and nine justices in the U.S. Supreme Court.

The Ninth Circuit summarizes:

"...[w]e affirm the district court's decision insofar as it pertains to the plaintiff's antitrust claims and reverse its dismissal of the First Amendment claim,"

and, subsequently, the Supreme Court of the United States of America "dismissed as improper" Marshall's ruling, stating:

"...[t]he complaint should not have been dismissed. The activities in which respondent allegedly seeks to engage plainly implicate First Amendment interests."

Multiple delays permeate the timeline of events before and after the separate rulings from the higher courts.

- In 1983 the case was filed in district court for the Central District of California. (#83-5846 cbm)
- In 1985 the United States Court of Appeals for the Ninth Circuit unanimously overturned Marshall's decision.(#754 f 2d)
- In 1986 the Supreme Court rendered unanimous judgment (9-0), to reverse Marshall and upheld the Ninth Circuit's 3-0 ruling (#476 U.S. 488, 1986)
- In 1992 Judge Marshall would issue her final ruling in defiance of the mandate issued by two higher courts having deferred the case in sum for five years subsequent to the Supreme Court decision.

While it was the opinion of Supreme Court Chief Justice William H. Rehnquist that: "the City of Los Angeles was obligated to allow [Preferred Communications Inc.] use of its physical capacity to further speech," the Plaintiff(s) were deprived a jury trial to determine damages for roughly a decade. Between 1983 and 1992, legal hardship and economic disenfranchisement were the product of continual delays; further, no public hearing was ever granted to plaintiff(s) in their effort to assert their first amendment rights under the U.S. constitution.

Final Judgment in the matter of Preferred Com'n v. City of Los Angeles

== See also ==
- List of African-American federal judges
- List of African-American jurists
- List of first women lawyers and judges in California
- List of United States federal judges by longevity of service

== Sources ==
Legal offices
Preceded by Robert Firth	Judge of the United States District Court for the Central District of California; 1980–2005	Succeeded by Valerie Baker Fairbank
Preceded by Terry J. Hatter Jr.	Chief Judge of the United States District Court for the Central District of California; 2001–2005	Succeeded by Alicemarie Huber Stotler

v
