= Marilyn L. Huff =

American judge (born 1951)

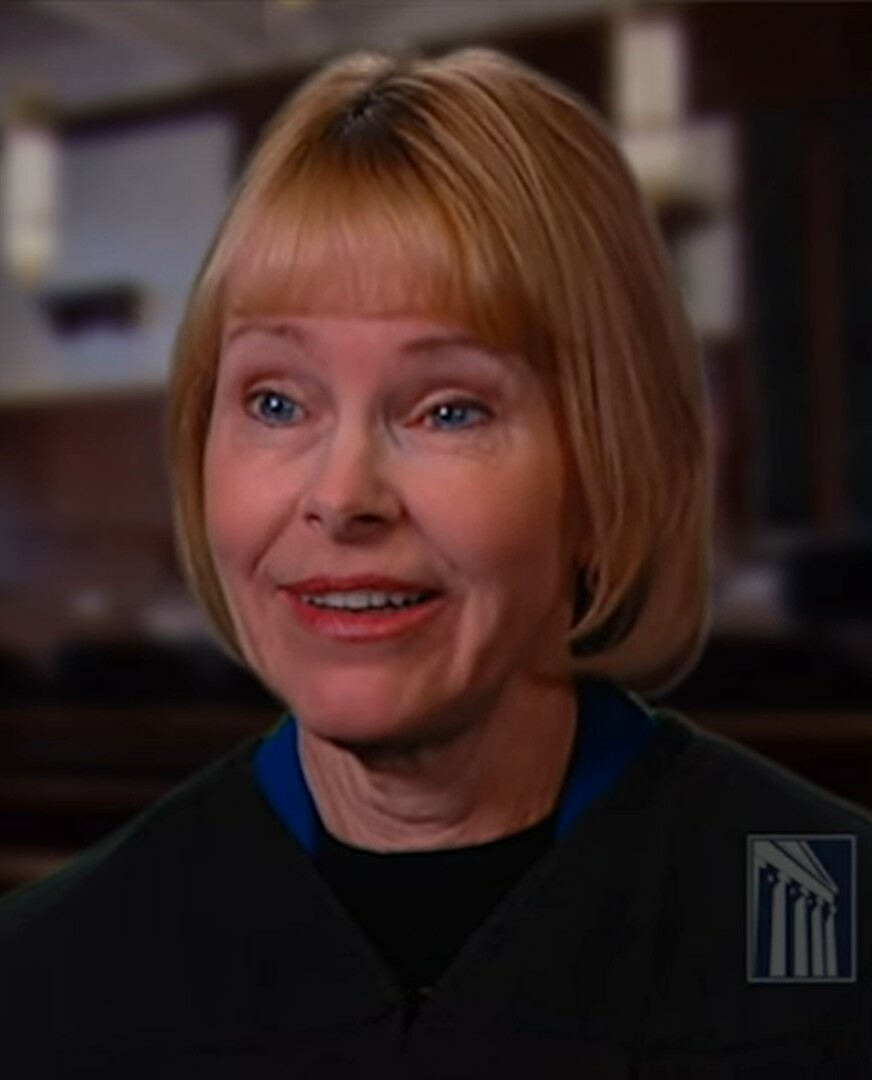
- Huff in 2014

Senior Judge of the United States District Court for the Southern District of California
- Incumbent
- Assumed office September 30, 2016

Chief Judge of the United States District Court for the Southern District of California
- In office 1998–2005
- Preceded by: Judith Keep
- Succeeded by: Irma Elsa Gonzalez

Judge of the United States District Court for the Southern District of California
- In office May 14, 1991 – September 30, 2016
- Appointed by: George H. W. Bush
- Preceded by: William Benner Enright
- Succeeded by: Todd W. Robinson

Personal details
- Born: March 6, 1951 (age 75) Ann Arbor, Michigan, U.S.
- Education: Calvin College (BA); University of Michigan (JD)

Marilyn L. Huff (born March 6, 1951) is a senior United States district judge of the United States District Court for the Southern District of California.

== Education and career ==
Huff was born in Ann Arbor, Michigan. She received a Bachelor of Arts degree from Calvin College in 1972 and a Juris Doctor from the University of Michigan Law School in 1976. She was in private practice of law in San Diego, California, from 1976 to 1991.

=== Federal judicial service ===
Huff was nominated by President George H. W. Bush on March 12, 1991, to a seat on the United States District Court for the Southern District of California vacated by Judge William Benner Enright. She was confirmed by the United States Senate on May 9, 1991, and received her commission on May 14, 1991. She served as Chief Judge from 1998 to 2005. She assumed senior status on September 30, 2016.

As a judge, she has gained a reputation in the field of intellectual property, speaking around the country on the topic.

== Notable cases ==
=== Lucent Technologies v. Microsoft ===
This case involved one of the largest awards for a computer code patent infringement in history. The original award was for $368 million. Microsoft made a motion for The final amount awarded with interest was $512 million. The case involved a patent claim involving selecting a date from a pop-up calendar and the use of a stylus.

=== Cooper v. Brown ===
After a panel of the Ninth Circuit affirmed Judge Huff's ruling in a death penalty case, the court declined to hear the case en banc over strenuous dissents. Judge William Fletcher wrote: "There is no way to say this politely. The district court failed to provide Cooper a fair hearing." He would also accuse Huff of "flouting" the Ninth Circuit's instructions and intentionally conducting testing in such a way as to deny Cooper the chance to prove his innocence.

Judge Pamela Ann Rymer by contrast would defend Judge Huff's ruling and rejected Fletcher's accusation that Huff had abused her discretion.

=== Sergeant Gary A. Stein v. United States of America ===
This case involved a Marine seeking a temporary restraining order against the Marine Corps. Stein stated that the Marine Corps did not follow their own procedures and the timing and content of the administrative separation proceedings were a deliberate attempt to "railroad" Stein by denying him time to prepare a defense or the ability to seek legal counsel. The majority of the complaint was ignored and the motion was denied on the basis that the panel's decision was not a "sure thing" and that Stein was unable to demonstrate irreparable harm.

== Sources ==
Legal offices
Preceded by William Benner Enright	Judge of the United States District Court for the Southern District of California; 1991–2016	Succeeded by Todd W. Robinson
Preceded by Judith Keep	Chief Judge of the United States District Court for the Southern District of California; 1998–2005	Succeeded by Irma Elsa Gonzalez
