= James McHall Jones =

American judge

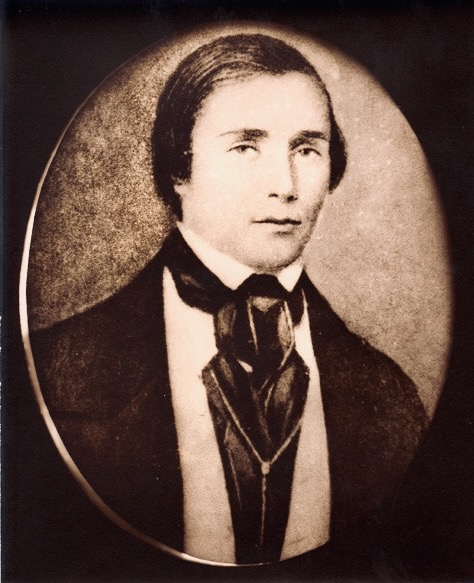
- James McHall Jones (1823–1851)

Judge of the United States District Court for the Southern District of California
- In office December 26, 1850 – December 15, 1851
- Appointed by: Millard Fillmore
- Preceded by: Seat established by 9 Stat. 521
- Succeeded by: Seat abolished

Personal details
- Born: James McHall Jones; December 31, 1823 Georgetown, Kentucky
- Died: December 15, 1851 (aged 27) San Jose, California
- Education: read law

James McHall Jones (December 31, 1823 – December 15, 1851) was a United States district judge of the United States District Court for the Southern District of California.

== Education and career ==
Born in Georgetown, Kentucky, Jones read law to enter the bar in 1843. He was in private practice in Plaquemine, Louisiana from 1843 to 1845. He traveled in Paris, France and Rome, Papal States from 1845 to 1846, returning to his private practice in Plaquemine from 1846 to 1848, and in San Jose, California (unorganized incorporated territory of the Mexican Cession until California's admission to the Union on September 9, 1850) from 1849 to 1850. He was the United States Attorney for the Southern District of California in 1850.

== Federal judicial service ==
On December 23, 1850, Jones was nominated by President Millard Fillmore to a new seat on the United States District Court for the Southern District of California created by 9 Stat. 521. He was confirmed by the United States Senate on December 26, 1850, and received his commission the same day. Jones served in that capacity until his death on December 15, 1851, in San Jose.

== Sources ==
Legal offices
Preceded by Seat established by 9 Stat. 521	Judge of the United States District Court for the Southern District of California; 1850–1851	Succeeded by Seat abolished
