= Robert S. Brewer Jr. =

American lawyer (born 1946)

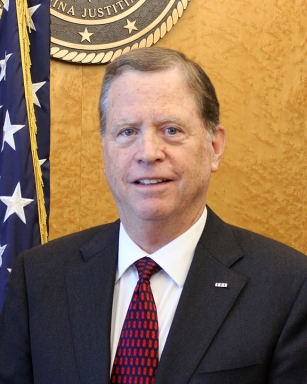

United States Attorney for the Southern District of California
- In office January 16, 2019 – February 28, 2021
- President: Donald Trump; Joe Biden
- Preceded by: Laura Duffy
- Succeeded by: Randy Grossman (acting)

Personal details
- Born: Robert Shelden Brewer Jr. April 30, 1946 (age 80) Hartford, Connecticut, U.S.
- Education: St. Lawrence University (BA); University of San Diego School of Law (JD)
- Awards: Silver Star; Bronze Star (x2)

Military service
- Allegiance: United States
- Branch/service: United States Army
- Years of service: 1968–1972
- Unit: United States Army Rangers
- Battles/wars: Vietnam War

Robert Shelden Brewer Jr. (born April 30, 1946) is an American attorney who served as the United States Attorney for the Southern District of California from 2019 to 2021.

== Biography ==
Brewer earned his Bachelor of Arts degree from St. Lawrence University and his Juris Doctor from the University of San Diego School of Law.

Prior to law school, Brewer served in the United States Army as an Airborne Ranger and received the Silver Star and two Bronze Stars for his service in the Vietnam War. He has been a Fellow in the American College of Trial Lawyers since 1999.

Brewer previously served as a Deputy District Attorney in Los Angeles County from 1975 to 1977, and as an Assistant United States Attorney in the Central District of California from 1977 to 1982, where he successfully prosecuted a variety of cases including espionage, bank robbery, murder for hire, and aircraft hijacking. He held various management positions, including Assistant Chief of the Criminal Division.

From 1982 to 2018, he had been in private practice, including from 1991 to 2009 as a partner at McKenna Long & Aldridge LLP, and from 2009 to 2014 as a partner at Jones Day.

== United States Attorney for the Southern District of California ==
On June 20, 2018, President Donald Trump nominated Brewer to become the next United States Attorney for the United States District Court for the Southern District of California. On June 25, 2018, his nomination was sent to the United States Senate. On January 2, 2019, his nomination was confirmed by voice vote. He was sworn into office on January 16, 2019.

On February 8, 2021, he along with 55 other Trump-era U.S. Attorneys were asked to resign. On February 26, 2021, he announced his resignation effective February 28, 2021.
