= Earl Ben Gilliam =

American judge

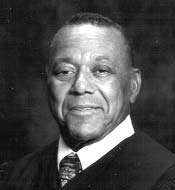

Senior Judge of the United States District Court for the Southern District of California
- In office April 2, 1993 – January 28, 2001

Judge of the United States District Court for the Southern District of California
- In office August 20, 1980 – April 2, 1993
- Appointed by: Jimmy Carter
- Preceded by: Seat established by 92 Stat. 1629
- Succeeded by: Napoleon A. Jones Jr.

Personal details
- Born: Earl Ben Gilliam; August 17, 1931 Clovis, New Mexico, US
- Died: January 28, 2001 (aged 69) San Diego, California, US
- Education: San Diego State University (BA); University of California, Hastings College of the Law (JD)

Earl Ben Gilliam (August 17, 1931 – January 28, 2001) was a United States district judge of the United States District Court for the Southern District of California.

== Education and career ==
Born in Clovis, New Mexico, Gilliam received a Bachelor of Arts degree from San Diego State University in 1953. He received a Juris Doctor from University of California, Hastings College of the Law in 1957.

He was a deputy district attorney of San Diego County, California from 1957 to 1961. He was in private practice of law in San Diego from 1961 to 1963. He was a judge of the San Diego Municipal Court from 1963 to 1975. He was a judge of the San Diego County Superior Court from 1975 to 1980.

== Federal judicial service ==
Gilliam was nominated by President Jimmy Carter on December 7, 1979, to the United States District Court for the Southern District of California, to a new seat created by 92 Stat. 1629. He was confirmed by the United States Senate on August 19, 1980, and received his commission on August 20, 1980. He assumed senior status due to a certified disability on April 2, 1993. His service was terminated on January 28, 2001, due to his death in San Diego.

== Final years ==
Side effects of heart surgery in 1993 left Gilliam paralyzed and on dialysis for the remainder of his life and led to his certification of disability. He did not perform any judicial duties after his certification of disability.

== See also ==
- List of African-American federal judges
- List of African-American jurists

== Sources ==
Legal offices
Preceded by Seat established by 92 Stat. 1629	Judge of the United States District Court for the Southern District of California; 1980–1993	Succeeded by Napoleon A. Jones Jr.
