= William Benner Enright =

American judge (1925–2020)

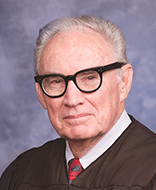

Senior Judge of the United States District Court for the Southern District of California
- In office July 12, 1990 – March 7, 2020

Judge of the United States District Court for the Southern District of California
- In office June 30, 1972 – July 12, 1990
- Appointed by: Richard Nixon
- Preceded by: J. Clifford Wallace
- Succeeded by: Marilyn L. Huff

Personal details
- Born: July 12, 1925 New York City, New York, U.S.
- Died: March 7, 2020 (aged 94) La Mesa, California, U.S.
- Education: Dartmouth College (AB); Loyola Marymount University (LLB)

William Benner Enright (July 12, 1925 – March 7, 2020) was a United States district judge of the United States District Court for the Southern District of California.

== Education and career ==
Born on July 12, 1925, in New York City, New York, Enright was in the United States Navy Reserve during World War II, from 1943 to 1946. He was a United States Navy Reserve, JAG Corps from 1947 to 1962. He received an Artium Baccalaureus degree from Dartmouth College in 1947 and a Bachelor of Laws from Loyola Law School in Los Angeles, California in 1950. He was a deputy district attorney of San Diego County, California from 1951 to 1954. He was in private practice in San Diego, California from 1954 to 1972.

=== Federal judicial service ===
On June 13, 1972, Enright was nominated by President Richard Nixon to a seat on the United States District Court for the Southern District of California vacated by Judge J. Clifford Wallace. Enright was confirmed by the United States Senate on June 28, 1972, and received his commission on June 30, 1972. He assumed senior status on July 12, 1990. Enright died on March 7, 2020, aged 94.

== See also ==
- List of United States federal judges by longevity of service

== Sources ==
Legal offices
Preceded by J. Clifford Wallace	Judge of the United States District Court for the Southern District of California; 1972–1990	Succeeded by Marilyn L. Huff
