= Napoleon A. Jones Jr. =

American judge

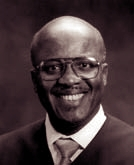

Senior Judge of the United States District Court for the Southern District of California
- In office September 19, 2007 – December 12, 2009

Judge of the United States District Court for the Southern District of California
- In office September 15, 1994 – September 19, 2007
- Appointed by: Bill Clinton
- Preceded by: Earl Ben Gilliam
- Succeeded by: Michael Anello

Judge of the San Diego Superior Court
- In office 1982 – September 15, 1994

Judge of the San Diego Municipal Court
- In office 1977–1982

Personal details
- Born: August 25, 1940 Hodge, Louisiana
- Died: December 12, 2009 (aged 69) North County, California
- Education: San Diego State University (BA, MSW); University of San Diego (JD)

Napoleon Al Jones Jr. (August 25, 1940 – December 12, 2009) was a United States district judge of the United States District Court for the Southern District of California.

== Early life and education ==
Jones was born in Hodge, Louisiana and graduated from San Diego High School in 1958. He received a Bachelor of Arts degree from San Diego State University in 1962, a Master of Social Work from San Diego State University in 1967, and a Juris Doctor from the University of San Diego School of Law in 1971. He was in the United States Army for three years from 1962 to 1965.

== Legal career ==
Jones was with California Rural Legal Assistance, in Modesto, California from 1971 to 1973. He was a legal intern from 1971 to 1972. He was a Staff Attorney from 1972 to 1973. He was a Staff Attorney with Defenders, Inc., San Diego, California from 1973 to 1975. He was in private practice in San Diego from 1975 to 1977.

== Judicial career ==
=== California state court judicial service ===
Jones was a judge on the San Diego Municipal Court, California from 1977 to 1982. He was a judge on the San Diego Superior Court, California from 1982 to 1994.

=== Federal judicial service ===
Jones was a United States District Judge of the United States District Court for the Southern District of California. Jones was nominated by President Bill Clinton on June 8, 1994, to a seat vacated by Earl Ben Gilliam. He was confirmed by the United States Senate on September 14, 1994, and received his commission on September 15, 1994. He assumed senior status on September 19, 2007, serving until his death on December 12, 2009.

== See also ==
- List of African-American federal judges
- List of African-American jurists

Legal offices
Preceded by Earl Ben Gilliam	Judge of the United States District Court for the Southern District of California; 1994–2007	Succeeded by Michael Anello
