= George Cosgrave =

American judge (1870–1945)

Senior Judge of the United States District Court for the Southern District of California
- In office August 31, 1940 – August 4, 1945

Judge of the United States District Court for the Southern District of California
- In office April 8, 1930 – August 31, 1940
- Appointed by: Herbert Hoover
- Preceded by: Edward J. Henning
- Succeeded by: Peirson Mitchell Hall

Personal details
- Born: George Cosgrave; February 20, 1870 Calaveras County, California
- Died: August 4, 1945 (aged 75)
- Education: read law

George Cosgrave (February 20, 1870 – August 4, 1945) was a United States district judge of the United States District Court for the Southern District of California.

== Education and career ==
Born in Calaveras County, California, Cosgrave read law to enter the bar in 1895. He was in private practice in Fresno, California from 1895 to 1930.

== Federal judicial service ==
On March 12, 1930, Cosgrave was nominated by President Herbert Hoover to a seat on the United States District Court for the Southern District of California vacated by Judge Edward J. Henning. Cosgrave was confirmed by the United States Senate on April 8, 1930, and received his commission the same day. He assumed senior status on August 31, 1940. He served in that capacity until his death on August 4, 1945.

== Sources ==
Legal offices
Preceded by Edward J. Henning	Judge of the United States District Court for the Southern District of California; 1930–1940	Succeeded by Peirson Mitchell Hall
