= Gordon Thompson Jr. =

American judge

Senior Judge of the United States District Court for the Southern District of California
- In office December 28, 1994 – July 5, 2015

Chief Judge of the United States District Court for the Southern District of California
- In office 1984–1991
- Preceded by: Howard Boyd Turrentine
- Succeeded by: Judith Keep

Judge of the United States District Court for the Southern District of California
- In office October 16, 1970 – December 28, 1994
- Appointed by: Richard Nixon
- Preceded by: Seat established by 84 Stat. 294
- Succeeded by: Jeffrey T. Miller

Personal details
- Born: Gordon Thompson Jr. December 28, 1929 San Diego, California, U.S.
- Died: July 5, 2015 (aged 85) San Diego, California, U.S.
- Party: Republican
- Education: University of Southern California (B.S.); Southwestern Law School (LL.B.)

Gordon Thompson Jr. (December 28, 1929 – July 5, 2015) was a United States district judge of the United States District Court for the Southern District of California.

== Education and career ==
Born in San Diego, California, Thompson received a Bachelor of Science degree from the University of Southern California in 1951 and a Bachelor of Laws from Southwestern University School of Law (now Southwestern Law School) in 1956. He was a deputy district attorney of San Diego County from 1957 to 1960. He was in private practice in San Diego from 1960 to 1970.

== Federal judicial service ==
Thompson was nominated by President Richard Nixon on October 7, 1970, to the United States District Court for the Southern District of California, to a new seat created by 84 Stat. 294. He was confirmed by the United States Senate on October 13, 1970, and received his commission on October 16, 1970. He served as Chief Judge from 1984 to 1991. He assumed senior status on December 28, 1994 and served in that capacity until his death on July 5, 2015.

== See also ==
- List of United States federal judges by longevity of service

== Sources ==
Legal offices
Preceded by Seat established by 84 Stat. 294	Judge of the United States District Court for the Southern District of California; 1970–1994	Succeeded by Jeffrey T. Miller
Preceded by Howard Boyd Turrentine	Chief Judge of the United States District Court for the Southern District of California; 1984–1991	Succeeded by Judith Keep
