= Robert S. Huie =

American judge (born 1976)

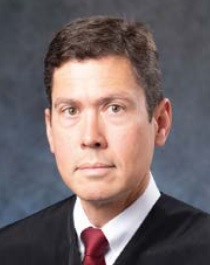

Judge of the United States District Court for the Southern District of California
- Incumbent
- Assumed office June 14, 2022
- Appointed by: Joe Biden
- Preceded by: Michael Anello

Personal details
- Born: Robert Steven Huie; 1976 (age 49–50) Albany, Georgia, U.S.
- Education: Calvin University (BA); Yale University (JD)

Robert Steven Huie (born 1976) is an American lawyer from California who is serving as a United States district judge of the United States District Court for the Southern District of California.

== Early life and education ==
Huie was born in 1976 in Albany, Georgia. He received his Bachelor of Arts from Calvin University in 1998 and his Juris Doctor from Yale Law School in 2002.

== Career ==
Huie served as a law clerk for Judge José A. Cabranes of the United States Court of Appeals for the Second Circuit from 2003 to 2004. He worked as a civil litigator at Latham & Watkins from 2004 to 2008 and as an attorney at Wiggin and Dana from 2002 to 2003. From 2008 to 2020, he served as an Assistant United States Attorney in the criminal division of the United States Attorney's office for the Southern District of California where he was Deputy Chief of the Office's Major Frauds and Public Corruption Section. He helped lead the early prosecution of the Fat Leonard scandal, which involved corruption in the United States Navy. From 2015 to 2018, Huie served as a legal advisor to the United States Department of Justice's Office of Overseas Prosecutorial Development, Assistance and Training.

From 2020 to 2022, he was a counsel with Jones Day in their San Diego office, where he served on the firm's Diversity, Inclusion & Advancement Committee.

=== Federal judicial service ===
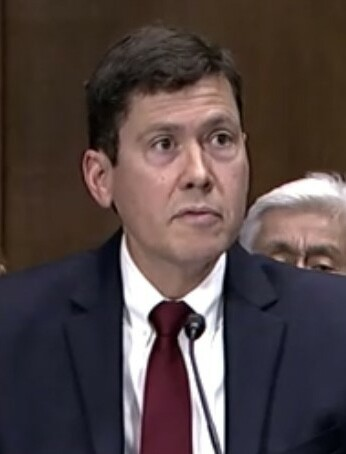
Huie during his hearing with the Senate Judiciary Committee

On January 19, 2022, President Joe Biden named Huie to serve as a United States district judge of the United States District Court for the Southern District of California. President Biden nominated Huie to the seat vacated by Judge Michael Anello, who assumed senior status on October 31, 2018. On March 2, 2022, a hearing on his nomination was held before the Senate Judiciary Committee. On April 4, 2022, his nomination was reported out of committee by a 11–10 vote. On June 9, 2022, the United States Senate confirmed his nomination by a 51–46 vote. Huie is the first Biden nominee to be confirmed in any district court without Senate Democrats invoking cloture. He received his judicial commission on June 14, 2022.

== Personal life ==
Huie is an American of Asian descent. His paternal grandfather was an immigrant from China.

== See also ==
- List of Asian American jurists
- List of Hispanic and Latino American jurists

Legal offices
Preceded by Michael Anello	Judge of the United States District Court for the Southern District of California; 2022–present	Incumbent
