= James E. Simmons Jr. =

American judge (born 1979)

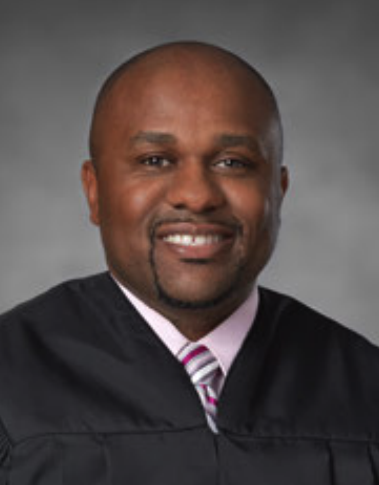

Judge of the United States District Court for the Southern District of California
- Incumbent
- Assumed office March 10, 2023
- Appointed by: Joe Biden
- Preceded by: Anthony J. Battaglia

Judge of the San Diego County Superior Court
- In office November 2, 2017 – March 10, 2023
- Appointed by: Jerry Brown
- Preceded by: David M. Szumowski
- Succeeded by: Alejandro Morales

Personal details
- Born: James Edward Simmons Jr. 1979 (age 46–47) Inglewood, California, U.S.
- Party: Democratic
- Education: University of California, Berkeley (BA); Golden Gate University (JD)

James Edward Simmons Jr. (born 1979) is an American lawyer serving as a United States district judge of the United States District Court for the Southern District of California. He served as a judge of the San Diego County Superior Court from 2017 to 2023.

== Early life and education ==
Simmons was raised in Los Angeles. He received a Bachelor of Arts from the University of California, Berkeley in 2001 and a Juris Doctor from the Golden Gate University School of Law in 2004.

== Career ==
In 2005, Simmons was a deputy city attorney in the San Diego City Attorney's Office. From 2006 to 2017, he was a deputy district attorney in the San Diego County District Attorney's Office. During his tenure, he worked in the juvenile division, the superior court division and the gangs division. He has volunteered for Project LEAD.

=== State judicial service ===
On November 2, 2017, Governor Jerry Brown appointed Simmons as a judge of the San Diego County Superior Court to fill the vacancy left by the retirement of Judge David M. Szumowski. He left the state bench in March 2023 when he was appointed to the federal bench.

=== Federal judicial service ===
On July 14, 2022, President Joe Biden nominated Simmons to serve as a United States district judge of the United States District Court for the Southern District of California. Senators Alex Padilla and Dianne Feinstein support his nomination. President Biden nominated Simmons to the seat vacated by Judge Anthony J. Battaglia, who assumed senior status on March 31, 2021. On November 30, 2022, a hearing on his nomination was held before the Senate Judiciary Committee. On January 3, 2023, his nomination was returned to the President under Rule XXXI, Paragraph 6 of the United States Senate. He was renominated on January 23, 2023. On February 9, 2023, his nomination was reported out of committee by a 13–8 vote. On March 1, 2023, the Senate invoked cloture on his nomination by a 51–45 vote. On March 9, 2023, his nomination was confirmed by a 51–43 vote. He received his judicial commission on March 10, 2023.

== See also ==
- List of African-American federal judges
- List of African-American jurists

Legal offices
| Preceded by Anthony J. Battaglia | Judge of the United States District Court for the Southern District of California; 2023–present | Incumbent |
