= Benjamin Franklin Bledsoe =

American judge

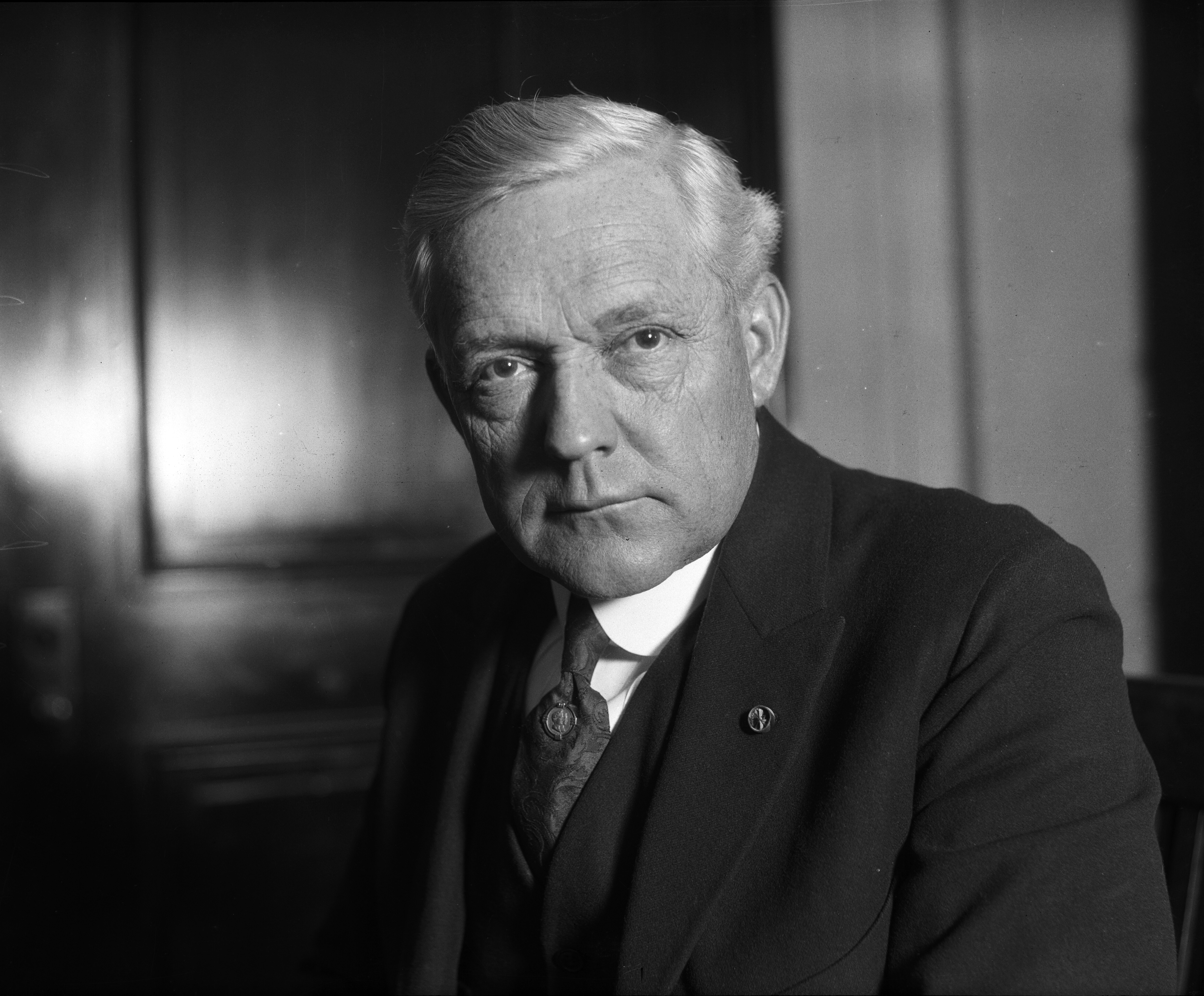
- Bledsoe, c. 1931

Judge of the United States District Court for the Southern District of California
- In office October 16, 1914 – March 24, 1925
- Appointed by: Woodrow Wilson
- Preceded by: Seat established by 38 Stat. 580
- Succeeded by: Edward J. Henning

Personal details
- Born: Benjamin Franklin Bledsoe; February 8, 1874 San Bernardino, California
- Died: October 30, 1938 (aged 64) Crestline, California
- Relatives: Robert Emmett Bledsoe Baylor, Jesse Bledsoe, Rindge family
- Education: Stanford University (A.B.) read law

Benjamin Franklin Bledsoe (February 8, 1874 – October 30, 1938) was a United States district judge of the United States District Court for the Southern District of California.

== Education and career ==
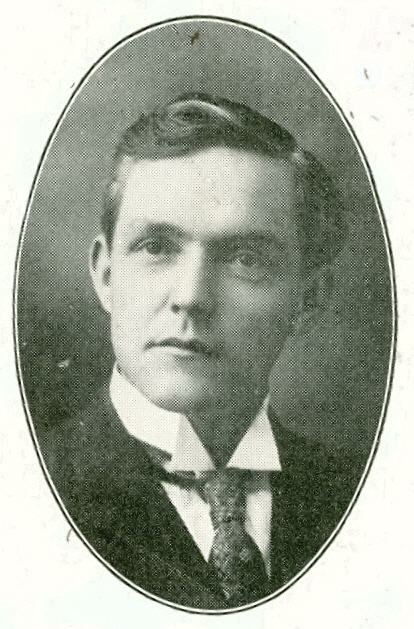
Bledsoe in 1909.

Born in San Bernardino, California, Bledsoe received an Artium Baccalaureus degree from Stanford University in 1896, and read law to enter the bar. He was in private practice in San Bernardino from 1896 to 1910. He was a Judge of the California Superior Court from 1900 to 1914.

== Federal judicial service ==
On September 30, 1914, Bledsoe was nominated by President Woodrow Wilson to a new seat on the United States District Court for the Southern District of California created by 38 Stat. 580. He was confirmed by the United States Senate on October 16, 1914, and received his commission the same day. He resigned on March 24, 1925.

=== Notable case ===
Bledsoe heard the case of Robert Goldstein who produced The Spirit of '76, a patriotic film about the American Revolution. Released just as World War I was starting federal censors required depictions of British atrocities to be cut. Goldstein was tried after an uncut version was shown. Bledsoe sentenced him to 10 years in prison and the media and public opinion turned harshly against him despite initially favorable reviews. Goldstein's sentence was commuted after three years but he was never able to clear his name.

== Later career and death ==
Bledsoe resigned from the federal bench to run for Mayor of Los Angeles, California, but was unsuccessful in that bid. He returned to private practice in Los Angeles from 1925 until his death on October 30, 1938, in Crestline, California. Bledsoe was a life member of the Society of Colonial Wars, admitted to membership December 6, 1919. Membership No. 6010, California Society No. 194.

== Sources ==
Legal offices
Preceded by Seat established by 38 Stat. 580	Judge of the United States District Court for the Southern District of California; 1914–1925	Succeeded by Edward J. Henning

California of the South Vol. II, by John Steven McGroarty, Pages 493-495, Clarke Publ., Chicago, Los Angeles, Indianapolis. 1933.
