= Peirson Mitchell Hall =

American judge

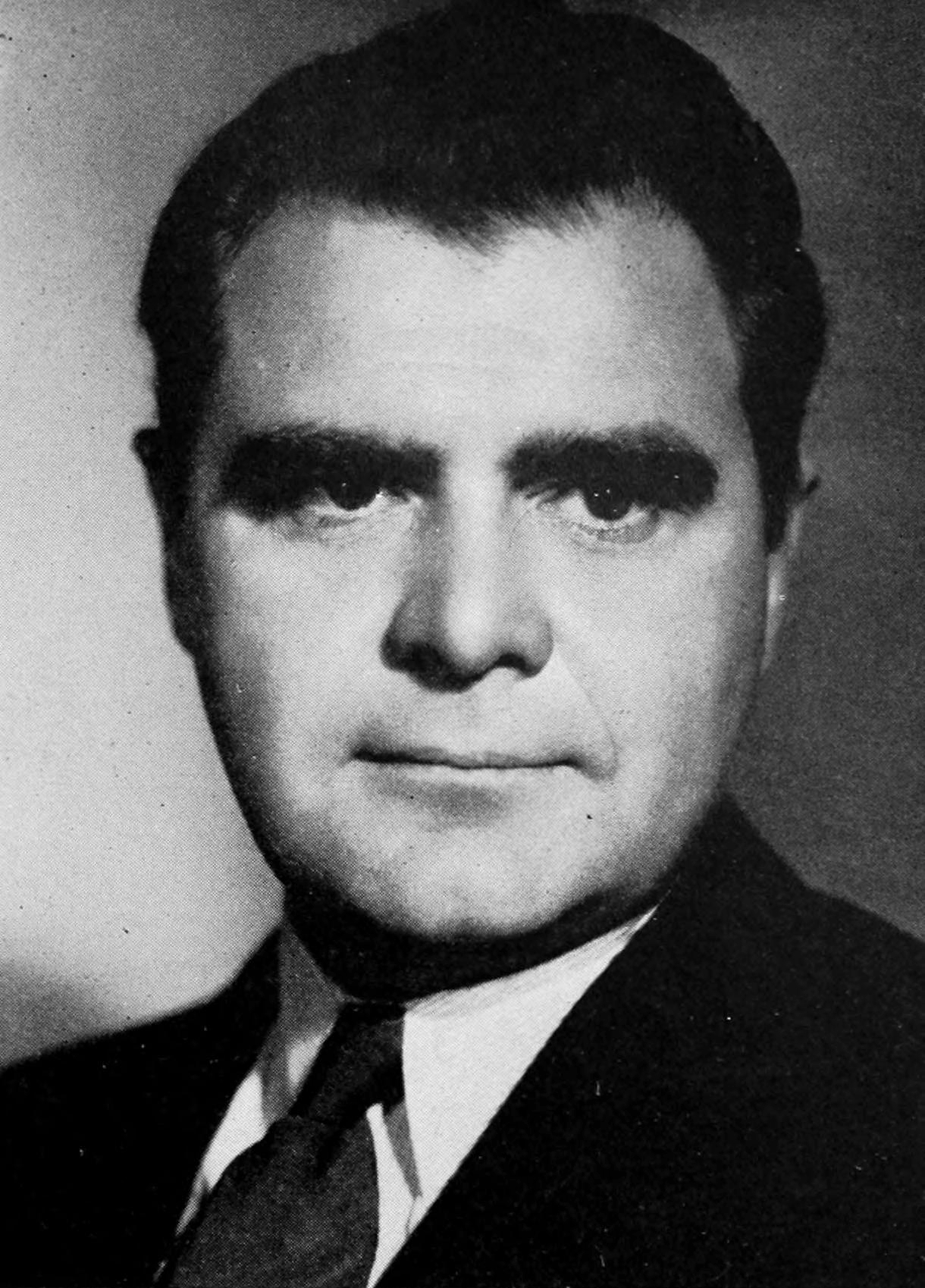
- Hall c. 1940

Senior Judge of the United States District Court for the Central District of California
- In office September 30, 1968 – December 8, 1979

Judge of the United States District Court for the Central District of California
- In office September 18, 1966 – September 30, 1968
- Appointed by: Operation of law
- Preceded by: Seat established by 80 Stat. 75
- Succeeded by: David W. Williams

Chief Judge of the United States District Court for the Southern District of California
- In office 1959–1964
- Preceded by: Benjamin Harrison
- Succeeded by: William Carey Mathes

Judge of the United States District Court for the Southern District of California
- In office July 3, 1942 – September 18, 1966
- Appointed by: Franklin D. Roosevelt
- Preceded by: George Cosgrave
- Succeeded by: Seat abolished

Judge of the Los Angeles County Superior Court
- In office December 1, 1939 – July 3, 1942
- Appointed by: Culbert Olson
- Preceded by: Minor Moore

United States Attorney for the Southern District of California
- In office May 1, 1933 – August 23, 1937
- Appointed by: Franklin D. Roosevelt
- Preceded by: Samuel W. McNabb
- Succeeded by: Benjamin Harrison

Member of the Los Angeles City Council for the 11th district
- In office July 1, 1925 – June 30, 1929
- Preceded by: District established
- Succeeded by: J. C. Barthel

Personal details
- Born: Peirson Mitchell Hall; July 31, 1894 Armour, South Dakota, U.S.
- Died: December 8, 1979 (aged 85) Palm Desert, California, U.S.
- Education: USC Gould School of Law; Read law

Peirson Mitchell Hall (July 31, 1894 – December 8, 1979) was a United States district judge of the United States District Court for the Southern District of California and the United States District Court for the Central District of California.

== Education and career ==
Born on July 31, 1894, in Armour, South Dakota, Hall attended two years of high school in Tecumseh, Nebraska. He lived in a Nebraska orphanage for a period of time before moving to Los Angeles to study law. He took a one-year course at Polytechnic High School in Los Angeles. He attended the USC Gould School of Law, then read law in 1916. He entered private practice in Los Angeles, California from 1916 to 1925.

== City Council service ==
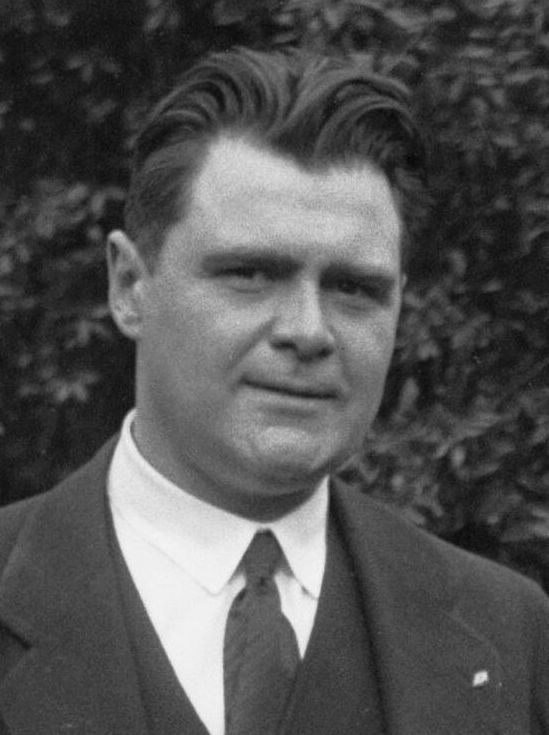
Hall in 1928

Hall was elected to the Los Angeles City Council to represent District 11 in 1925 and was reelected in 1927. Hall, along with Clifford W. Henderson and Henry G. Bakes, "persuaded the city to lease a 640-acre bean and barley patch then known as Mines Field," which became the Los Angeles International Airport.

In 1929, Hall ran for election as Los Angeles city attorney but lost to Erwin P. Werner in the June final, 152,566 to 82,444. He returned to private practice in Los Angeles from 1929 to 1934.

== State judicial service ==
Hall was the United States Attorney for the Southern District of California from 1934 to 1937. He resumed private practice in Los Angeles from 1937 to 1939. He was a Judge of the Superior Court of California for the County of Los Angeles from 1939 to 1942. He was head of the Selective Service System for Southern California in 1941.

== Federal judicial service ==
Hall was nominated by President Franklin D. Roosevelt on February 17, 1942, to a seat on the United States District Court for the Southern District of California vacated by Judge George Cosgrave. He was confirmed by the United States Senate on June 30, 1942, and received his commission on July 3, 1942. He served as Chief Judge from 1959 to 1964. Hall was reassigned by operation of law to the United States District Court for the Central District of California on September 18, 1966, to a new seat authorized by 80 Stat. 75. He assumed senior status on September 30, 1968. His service terminated on December 8, 1979, due to his death.

=== Notable cases ===
- Trial of an army officer charged with stealing $106,000 in Japanese gold missing since the surrender of Formosa (Taiwan) to U.S. forces at the end of World War II.
- Jailing of 10 people for refusal to answer questions in a grand jury proceeding about Los Angeles Communist leaders and organizations.
- Freeing of war crimes suspect Andrija Artukovic, former interior minister in Croatia, when Hall ruled that no extradition treaty existed between the United States and Yugoslavia, which had sought Artukovic for trial.

=== Aviation law ===
Hall was considered the foremost authority of aviation law among the nation's 500 federal judges.

== Personal ==
Hall was married five times. He and his first wife were divorced in 1929, and Hall sued journalist Fred H. Girnau for libel when Girnau printed a two-column article asserting that testimony at the divorce proceedings showed that Hall "used the pretty face of his wife for a punching bag." Hall's attorney declared the statement untrue and Mrs. Hall said the report was false and malicious. The longest marriage was to Gertrude May Engel, beginning in 1930. They had two daughters, Mary and Suzanne, and were divorced in 1956 after court battles that lasted several years. She died in 1964. His fourth wife was Kathryn Kyle Black, whom he married in Kansas City, Kansas, in November 1956. She died in 1970. Next he married Mari Bahn, who died in February 1973.

Hall was a Mason and an Elk. He died at his home in Palm Desert, California, on December 8, 1979, at the age of 85.

Political offices
Preceded by Predecessor missing	Los Angeles City Council 11th District; 1925–1929	Succeeded by J.C. Barthel
Legal offices
Preceded by George Cosgrave	Judge of the United States District Court for the Southern District of California; 1942–1966	Succeeded by Seat abolished
Preceded by Benjamin Harrison	Chief Judge of the United States District Court for the Southern District of California; 1959–1964	Succeeded by William Carey Mathes
Preceded by Seat established by 80 Stat. 75	Judge of the United States District Court for the Central District of California; 1966–1968	Succeeded by David W. Williams
