= Michael Anello =

American judge (born 1943)

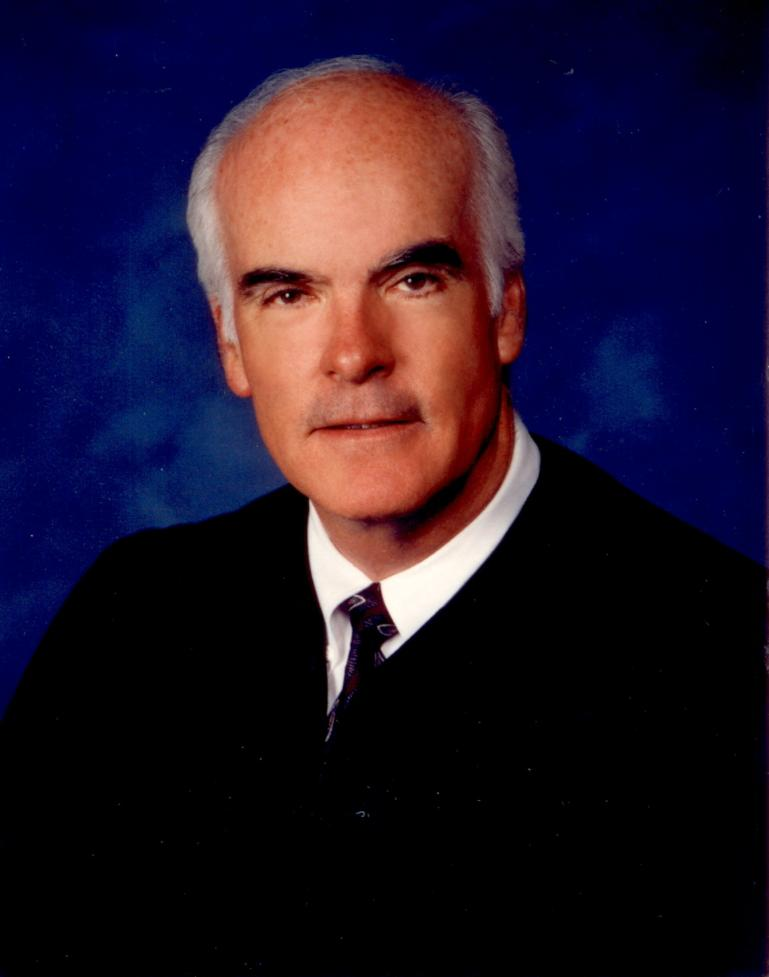

Senior Judge of the United States District Court for the Southern District of California
- Incumbent
- Assumed office October 31, 2018

Judge of the United States District Court for the Southern District of California
- In office October 10, 2008 – October 31, 2018
- Appointed by: George W. Bush
- Preceded by: Napoleon A. Jones Jr.
- Succeeded by: Robert S. Huie

Judge of the San Diego Superior Court
- In office 1998–2008

Personal details
- Born: Michael Monroe Anello; August 16, 1943 (age 82) Miami, Florida, U.S.
- Education: Bowdoin College (BA); Georgetown University Law Center (JD)

Michael Monroe Anello (born August 16, 1943) is a senior United States district judge of the United States District Court for the Southern District of California.

== Early life and education ==
Born in Miami, Florida, Anello received a Bachelor of Arts degree from Bowdoin College in 1965 and a Juris Doctor from Georgetown University Law Center in 1968.

== Career ==
Anello was on active duty in the United States Marine Corps from 1968 to 1972, and in the United States Marine Corps Reserve from 1973 to 1990. He was a deputy city attorney of San Diego City Attorney's Office, California from 1972 to 1973. He was in private practice in San Diego from 1973 to 1998.

== Judicial service ==
In 1998, Governor Pete Wilson appointed Anello to a seat on the San Diego Superior Court, where Anello then served until 2008. One of the final cases he presided over in that position was a suit by San Diego firefighters who claimed sexual harassment after being required to drive their fire truck in a city gay pride parade; the suit ended in a hung jury, and Anello declared a mistrial.

On April 30, 2008, Anello was nominated by President George W. Bush to a seat on the United States District Court for the Southern District of California vacated by Napoleon A. Jones Jr. Anello was confirmed by the United States Senate on September 26, 2008, and received his commission on October 10, 2008. Anello assumed senior status on October 31, 2018.

In 2016, Anello presided over a securities fraud trial brought by SeaWorld investors who "claimed company officials misled them about the impact of the documentary Blackfish", dismissing the suit due to an absence of evidence that the officials had knowingly misrepresented the cause of declining attendance at the park.

Legal offices
Preceded by Napoleon A. Jones Jr.	Judge of the United States District Court for the Southern District of California; 2008–2018	Succeeded by Robert S. Huie
