= Laurie Grindle =

American aeronautical engineer

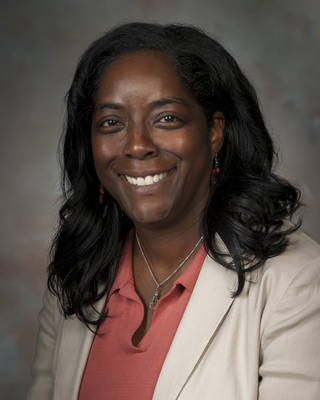
- Portrait in 2019
- Born: May 2, 1970; Los Angeles, California, U.S.
- Education: University of California, Davis (BS); California State University, Fresno (MS)
- Occupation: Aerospace engineer
- Years active: 1992–present
- Known for: NASA X-43
- Awards: NASA Outstanding Leadership Medal
- Scientific career
- Workplaces: Armstrong Flight Research Center

Laurie A. Marshall Grindle (born May 2, 1970) is an American aeronautical engineer. She became chief engineer of the NASA X-43 project in 2004 and was appointed deputy director of NASA's Armstrong Flight Research Center in 2023.

== Early life and education ==
Grindle was born in Los Angeles to an African-American family. Her mother is noted senior United States district judge Consuelo Bland Marshall. Her father earned his pilot's license the year that she was born, and she became fascinated by mathematics, science and flight. At high school, she played basketball and was on the athletics team. At the age of 18, she earned her pilot's license and qualified for instrument flying.

She earned a Bachelor of Science in aeronautical and mechanical engineering at the University of California, Davis in 1993, and a Master of Science in mechanical engineering from California State University, Fresno in 1998. Her masters project was based at Edwards Air Force Base.

== Career ==
Grindle moved to the Armstrong Flight Research Center in 1992, where she started an internship in the Aerodynamics Branch. In 1993, Grindle was appointed full time at the Armstrong Flight Research Center. She was involved with experiments on the McDonnell Douglas F/A-18 Systems Research Aircraft, using air pressure to study angles of attack. She also worked on the F-16XL Ship 2 Supersonic Laminar Flow Control project, and was chief engineer on the hypersonic NASA X-43.

Grindle was appointed director of programs and projects, working on advocacy and formulation of flight projects. She became deputy director of the Center in March 2023.

== Awards and honors ==
- NASA Exceptional Service Medal (2005)
- NASA Exceptional Achievement Medal (2013)
- Women in NASA honoree (2013)
- NASA Outstanding Leadership Medal (2018)

== Selected publications ==
- Joyce, Phillip; Pomroy, John; Grindle, Laurie (May 16, 2005). The Hyper-X Launch Vehicle: Challenges and Design Considerations for Hypersonic Flight Testing. American Institute of Aeronautics and Astronautics. doi:10.2514/6.2005-3333. ISBN 978-1-62410-068-0.
- Grindle, Laurie; Hackenberg, Davis L. (September 13, 2016). "Unmanned Aircraft Systems (UAS) Integration in the National Airspace System (NAS) Project: KDP-A for Phase 2 Minimum Operational Performance Standards".
- Kopardekar, Parimal; Grindle, Laurie (September 21, 2021). "NASA ARMD Wildfire Management Workshop".
