= Robert Firth (judge) =

American judge (1918–1984)

Senior Judge of the United States District Court for the Central District of California
- In office October 31, 1979 – January 4, 1984

Judge of the United States District Court for the Central District of California
- In office March 8, 1974 – October 31, 1979
- Appointed by: Richard Nixon
- Preceded by: Charles Hardy Carr
- Succeeded by: Consuelo Bland Marshall

Personal details
- Born: Robert Firth; May 12, 1918 Harrison, New Jersey
- Died: January 4, 1984 (aged 65)
- Education: Indiana University (A.B.); Harvard Law School (LL.B.)

Robert Firth (May 12, 1918 – January 4, 1984) was a United States district judge of the United States District Court for the Central District of California.

== Education and career ==
Born in Harrison, New Jersey, Firth received an Artium Baccalaureus degree from Indiana University in 1940 and was in the United States Navy as a Lieutenant during World War II, from 1941 to 1945. He received a Bachelor of Laws from Harvard Law School in 1948, remaining a United States Naval Reserve as a Lieutenant from 1946 to 1952. He was in private practice in Los Angeles, California from 1949 to 1950, and was in private practice in Pomona, California from 1950 to 1967. He was a judge of the Los Angeles County Superior Court from 1967 to 1974, also serving as a lecturer at the University of La Verne College of Law in La Verne, California from 1971 to 1973.

== Federal judicial service ==
On February 6, 1974, Firth was nominated by President Richard Nixon to a seat on the United States District Court for the Central District of California was vacated by Judge Charles Hardy Carr. Firth was confirmed by the United States Senate on March 1, 1974, and received his commission on March 8, 1974. He assumed senior status due to a certified disability on October 31, 1979, and served in that capacity until his death on January 4, 1984.

== Sources ==
Legal offices
Preceded by Charles Hardy Carr	Judge of the United States District Court for the Central District of California; 1974–1979	Succeeded by Consuelo Bland Marshall
