= Cathy Ann Bencivengo =

American judge (born 1958)

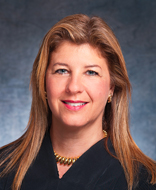

Judge of the United States District Court for the Southern District of California
- Incumbent
- Assumed office February 10, 2012
- Appointed by: Barack Obama
- Preceded by: Jeffrey T. Miller

Magistrate Judge of the United States District Court for the Southern District of California
- In office 2005 – February 10, 2012

Personal details
- Born: Cathy Ann Palumbo; August 24, 1958 (age 67) Teaneck, New Jersey, U.S.
- Education: Rutgers University (BA, MA); University of Michigan (JD)

Cathy Ann Palumbo Bencivengo (born August 24, 1958) is a United States district judge of the United States District Court for the Southern District of California.

== Early life and education ==
Bencivengo was born Cathy Ann Palumbo in Teaneck, New Jersey. Bencivengo earned a Bachelor of Arts degree in 1980 from Rutgers University and a Master of Arts degree in 1981 from Rutgers. She then earned a Juris Doctor in 1988 from University of Michigan Law School.

== Career ==
In 1988, Bencivengo joined a predecessor to the law firm DLA Piper as an associate and became a partner in 1996 where she remained until 2005.

=== Federal judicial service ===
In 2005, the judges of the United States District Court for the Southern District of California selected Bencivengo to be a United States magistrate judge.

On May 11, 2011, President Barack Obama nominated Bencivengo to a seat on the United States District Court for the Southern District of California, to replace Judge Jeffrey T. Miller, who assumed senior status in June 2010. She was confirmed by the Senate on February 9, 2012 by a 90–6 vote. She received her commission on February 10, 2012.

Legal offices
Preceded by Jeffrey T. Miller	Judge of the United States District Court for the Southern District of California; 2012–present	Incumbent
