= Jeffrey T. Miller =

American judge (born 1943)

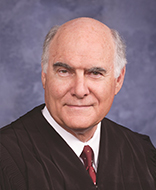

Senior Judge of the United States District Court for the Southern District of California
- Incumbent
- Assumed office June 6, 2010

Judge of the United States District Court for the Southern District of California
- In office May 27, 1997 – June 6, 2010
- Appointed by: Bill Clinton
- Preceded by: Gordon Thompson Jr.
- Succeeded by: Cathy Ann Bencivengo

Judge of the Superior Court of California, San Diego County
- In office 1987–1997

Personal details
- Born: Jeffrey Timo Miller; January 14, 1943 (age 83) New York City, New York, U.S.
- Spouse: Jada L. Corbett
- Education: University of California, Los Angeles (BA, JD)

Jeffrey Timo Miller (born January 14, 1943) is a senior United States district judge of the United States District Court for the Southern District of California.

== Education and career ==
Born in New York City, Miller received a Bachelor of Arts degree from the University of California, Los Angeles in 1964 and a Juris Doctor from the UCLA School of Law in 1967. Miller was a deputy state attorney general of California from 1968 to 1987. He was a judge on the San Diego County Superior Court from 1987 to 1997.

=== Federal judicial service ===
On January 7, 1997, Miller was nominated by President Bill Clinton to a seat on the United States District Court for the Southern District of California vacated by Gordon Thompson Jr. Miller was confirmed by the United States Senate on May 23, 1997, and received his commission on May 27, 1997. On June 6, 2010 he assumed senior status.

=== Notable cases ===
During his tenure as a federal judge, Miller has handled some noteworthy cases. In 2005 he presided over a corruption case against San Diego City Councilmembers Ralph Inzunza and Michael Zucchet. After the jury convicted both men and a co-defendant, Miller took the unusual step of overturning the jury verdict against Zucchet and acquitting him on most of the charges, saying the evidence against him was insufficient. The ruling was upheld by the Ninth Circuit Court of Appeals.

In 2012 he heard the wrongful death civil suit in the case of the crash of a U.S. Marine jet in 2008, which killed four people in a residential area in San Diego. Trying the case without a jury, Miller awarded $17.8 million to the survivors.

In 2013 he presided over a case against four Somali immigrants who were accused of sending money to the terrorist group al-Shabab. The case used information gathered by a secret National Security Agency (NSA) program for collecting telephone metadata. He sentenced the men to prison; his rulings regarding the NSA's surveillance program were affirmed on appeal.

In November 2016, Miller successfully brokered settlement talks in three separate lawsuits against Donald Trump alleging fraudulent practices by Trump University.

== Sources ==
Legal offices
Preceded by Gordon Thompson Jr.	Judge of the United States District Court for the Southern District of California; 1997–2010	Succeeded by Cathy Ann Bencivengo
