= Anthony J. Battaglia =

American judge (born 1949)

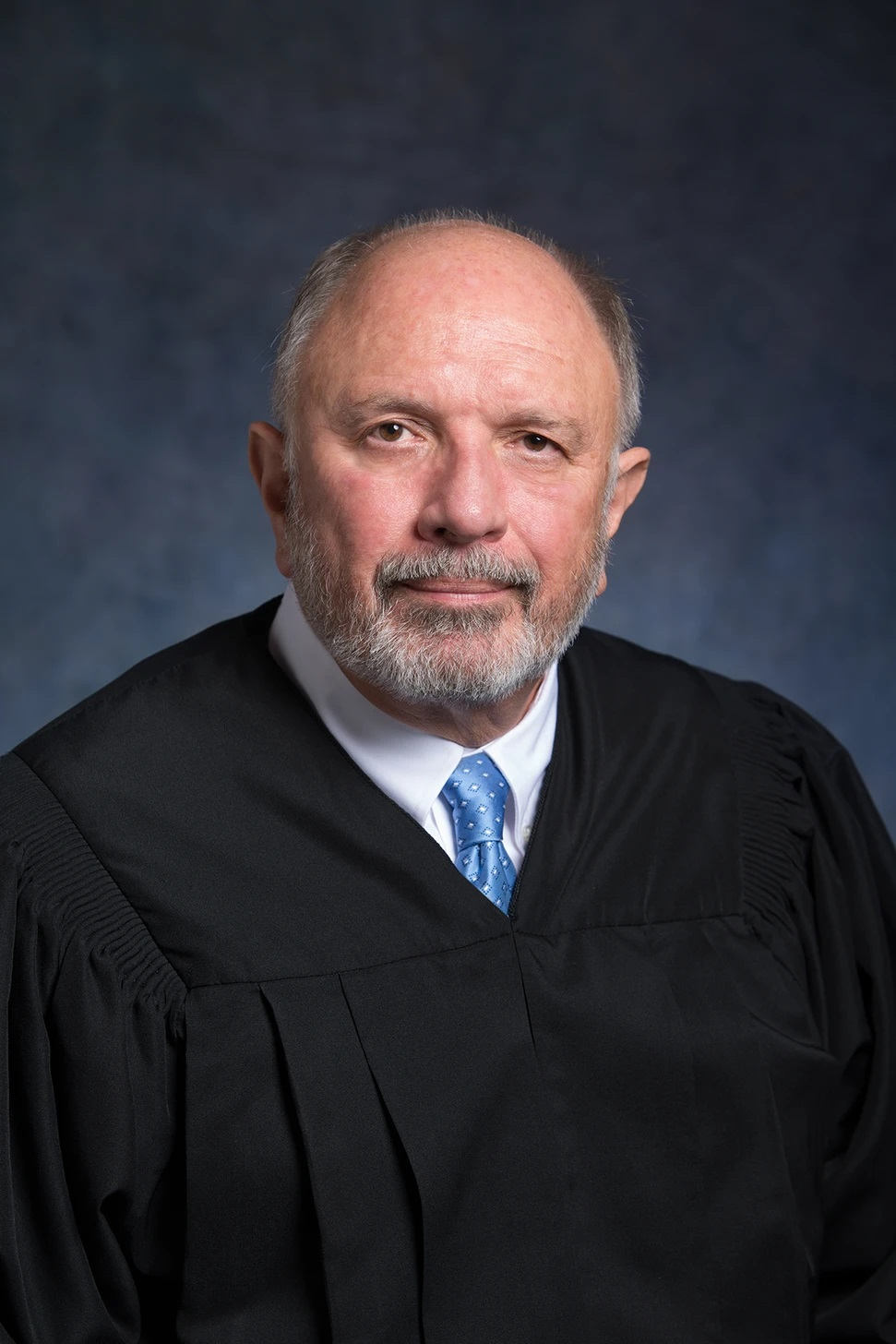

Senior Judge of the United States District Court for the Southern District of California
- Incumbent
- Assumed office March 31, 2021

Judge of the United States District Court for the Southern District of California
- In office March 9, 2011 – March 31, 2021
- Appointed by: Barack Obama
- Preceded by: M. James Lorenz
- Succeeded by: James E. Simmons Jr.

Magistrate Judge of the United States District Court for the Southern District of California
- In office 1993–2011

Personal details
- Born: April 10, 1949 (age 76) San Diego, California, U.S.
- Education: Alliant International University (BA); California Western School of Law (JD)

Anthony Joseph Battaglia (born April 10, 1949) is a senior United States district judge of the United States District Court for the Southern District of California and a former United States magistrate judge of the same court.

== Biography ==
Battaglia was born in 1949, in San Diego, California. He took classes at San Diego Mesa College before transferring to United States International University, where he graduated in 1971 with a Bachelor of Arts. Battaglia then earned his Juris Doctor from California Western School of Law in 1974.

== Career ==
From 1974 to 1980, Battaglia practiced with the Law Offices of John Marin then as a sole practitioner from 1980 to 1991, and finally with the firm of Battaglia, Fitzpatrick & Battaglia from 1991 to 1993.

=== Federal judicial service ===
In 1993, Battaglia was selected to serve as a United States magistrate judge for the United States District Court for the Southern District of California.

On May 20, 2010, President Barack Obama nominated Battaglia for a district court judgeship on the Southern District of California. to fill the seat vacated by Judge James Lorenz. He was renominated at the beginning of the 112th Congress. On February 4, 2011, Battaglia was unanimously approved by the Senate Judiciary Committee. On March 7, 2011, the Senate confirmed his nomination by a 89–0 vote. and he received his commission on March 9, 2011. He assumed senior status on March 31, 2021.

Legal offices
Preceded by M. James Lorenz	Judge of the United States District Court for the Southern District of California; 2011–2021	Succeeded by James E. Simmons Jr.
