= Leland Chris Nielsen =

American judge

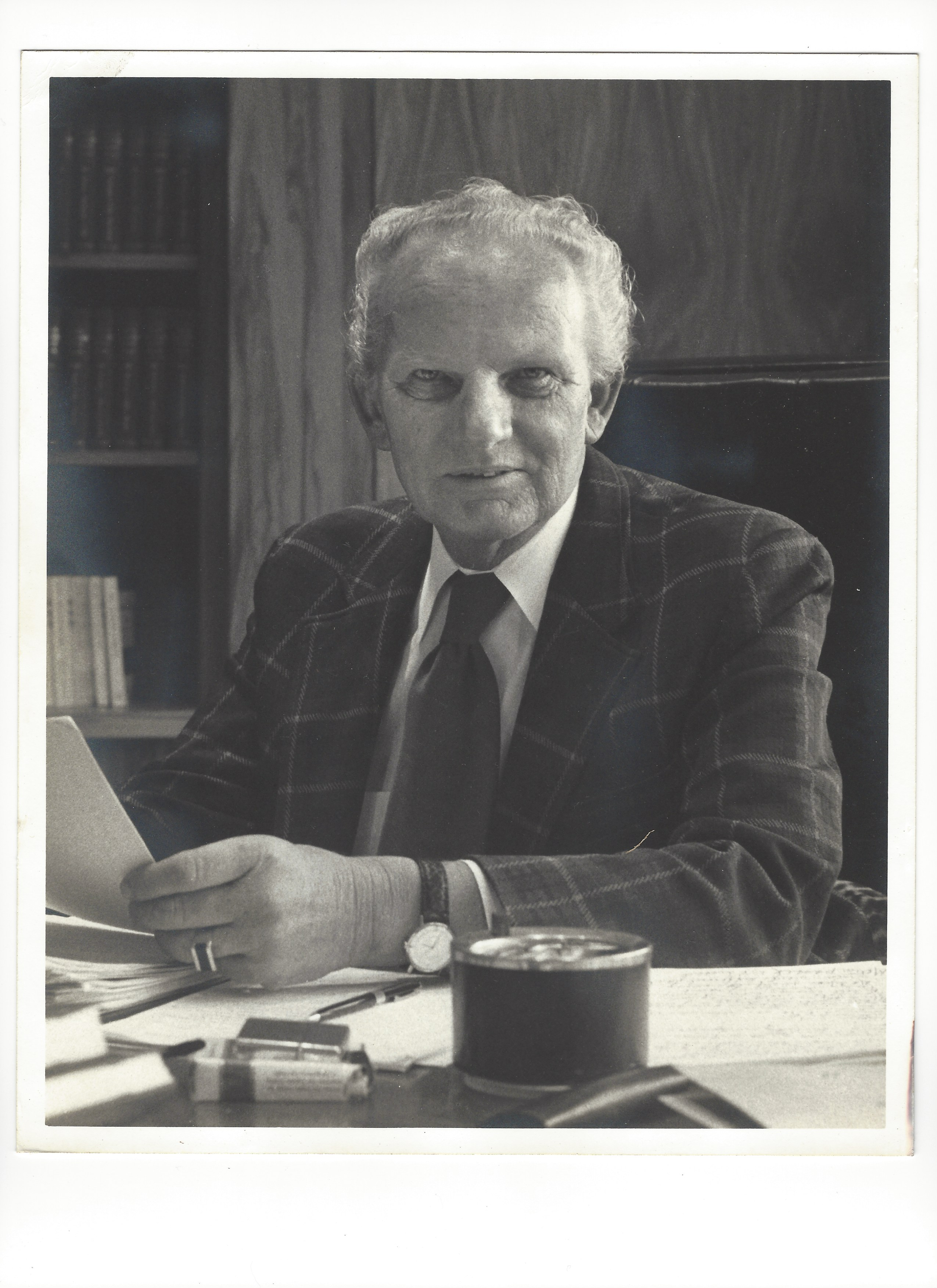

Senior Judge of the United States District Court for the Southern District of California
- In office June 14, 1985 – September 23, 1999

Judge of the United States District Court for the Southern District of California
- In office May 20, 1971 – June 14, 1985
- Appointed by: Richard Nixon
- Preceded by: Seat established by 84 Stat. 294
- Succeeded by: John Skylstead Rhoades Sr.

Personal details
- Born: Leland Chris Nielsen; June 14, 1919 Vesper, Kansas
- Died: September 23, 1999 (aged 80)
- Education: Washburn College (A.B.); USC Gould School of Law (J.D.)

Leland Chris Nielsen (June 14, 1919 – September 23, 1999) was a United States district judge of the United States District Court for the Southern District of California.

== Education and career ==
Born in Vesper, Kansas, Nielsen received an Artium Baccalaureus degree from Washburn College in 1941 and was in the United States Army Air Corps during World War II, from 1941 to 1946, achieving the rank of Major. He received a Juris Doctor from the USC Gould School of Law in 1946. He was in private practice in Los Angeles, California from 1946 to 1947. He was a deputy city attorney of Los Angeles from 1947 to 1951. He was in private practice in San Diego, California from 1951 to 1968. He was a judge of the Superior Court of California for San Diego County from 1968 to 1971.

== Federal judicial service ==
Nielsen was nominated by President Richard Nixon on April 21, 1971, to the United States District Court for the Southern District of California, to a new seat created by 84 Stat. 294. He was confirmed by the United States Senate on May 20, 1971, and received his commission the same day. He assumed senior status on June 14, 1985. Nielsen served in that capacity until his death on September 23, 1999.

== Sources ==
Legal offices
| Preceded by Seat established by 84 Stat. 294 | Judge of the United States District Court for the Southern District of California; 1971–1985 | Succeeded by John Skylstead Rhoades Sr. |
