= Todd W. Robinson =

American judge (born 1967)

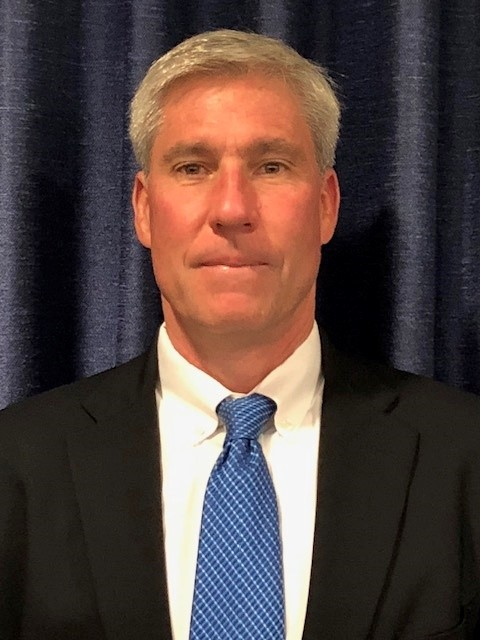

Judge of the United States District Court for the Southern District of California
- Incumbent
- Assumed office September 18, 2020
- Appointed by: Donald Trump
- Preceded by: Marilyn L. Huff

Personal details
- Born: Todd Wallace Robinson; 1967 (age 58–59) Jacksonville, Florida, U.S.
- Education: University of California, Berkeley (BA); Georgetown University (JD)

Todd Wallace Robinson (born 1967) is an American lawyer and jurist who serves as a United States district judge of the United States District Court for the Southern District of California. He previously served as an assistant United States attorney for the same district from 1997 to 2003 and again from 2005 to 2020.

== Education ==
Robinson earned his Bachelor of Arts from the University of California, Berkeley, and his Juris Doctor, cum laude, from the Georgetown University Law Center.

== Career ==
Robinson began his career as a trial attorney in the United States Department of Justice Criminal Division's Narcotic and Dangerous Drug Section, where he worked from 1993 to 1997. In 1997, he became an Assistant United States Attorney for the Southern District of California. In 2004, Robinson served as an Operations Officer with the Central Intelligence Agency. He then returned to the United States Attorney's Office and was Deputy Chief of the General Crimes Section in 2007. From 2008 to 2020, he served as Senior Litigation Counsel in the Criminal Division. He left the Office after becoming a judge.

== Federal judicial service ==
On September 12, 2019, President Donald Trump announced his intent to nominate Robinson to serve as a United States district judge of the United States District Court for the Southern District of California. On November 21, 2019, his nomination was sent to the Senate. President Trump nominated Robinson to the seat on the United States District Court for the Southern District of California vacated by Judge Marilyn L. Huff, who assumed senior status on September 30, 2016. On January 3, 2020, his nomination was returned to the President under Rule XXXI, Paragraph 6 of the United States Senate. On February 13, 2020, his renomination was sent to the Senate. On June 17, 2020, a hearing on his nomination was held before the Senate Judiciary Committee. On July 23, 2020, his nomination was reported out of committee by a voice vote. On September 15, 2020, the Senate invoked cloture on his nomination by a 83–13 vote. On September 16, 2020, his nomination was confirmed by a 86–10 vote. He received his judicial commission on September 18, 2020.

Legal offices
Preceded by Marilyn L. Huff	Judge of the United States District Court for the Southern District of California; 2020–present	Incumbent
