= Thomas J. Whelan (judge) =

American judge (born 1940)

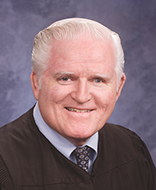

Senior Judge of the United States District Court for the Southern District of California
- Incumbent
- Assumed office August 15, 2010

Judge of the United States District Court for the Southern District of California
- In office October 22, 1998 – August 15, 2010
- Appointed by: Bill Clinton
- Preceded by: John Skylstead Rhoades Sr.
- Succeeded by: Gonzalo P. Curiel

Judge of the Superior Court of California, San Diego County
- In office 1990–1998

Personal details
- Born: Thomas John Whelan; February 21, 1940 (age 86) St. Paul, Minnesota, U.S.
- Spouse: Catherine A. Lindseth
- Education: University of San Diego (BA, JD)

Thomas John Whelan (born February 21, 1940) is a senior United States district judge of the United States District Court for the Southern District of California.

== Early life and education ==
Born in St. Paul, Minnesota, Whelan received a Bachelor of Arts degree from the University of San Diego in 1961 and a Juris Doctor from the University of San Diego School of Law in 1965.

== Career ==
Whelan was a contracts administrator, planner and estimator for General Dynamics Corp. from 1961 to 1969. He was a deputy district attorney of San Diego from 1969 to 1989.

== Judicial career ==
Whelan was a judge on the San Diego County Superior Court from 1990 to 1998. As a superior court judge, Whelan presided over the infamous Betty Broderick trials in San Diego.

Whelan is a United States district judge of the United States District Court for the Southern District of California. Whelan was nominated by President Bill Clinton on June 4, 1998, to a seat vacated by John Skylstead Rhoades Sr. He was confirmed by the United States Senate on October 21, 1998, and received his commission on October 22, 1998. He assumed senior status on August 15, 2010.

Notable cases that Whelan has presided over on the district bench include:

- In 2003, Whelan was the judge assigned to a lawsuit brought by the Imperial Irrigation District (representing farmers in the Imperial Valley, California), against the U.S. Department of the Interior, challenging the federal government's 11% cut in Colorado River water allocated to farmers. In 2003, Whelan ordered a reversal in the cuts pending the resolution of the suit.
- In 2004, Whelan denied the Rincon Band of Luiseno Mission Indians's motion for a temporary restraining order seeking to block California Governor Arnold Schwarzenegger's new compacts with five other Indian tribes allowing them to establish casinos in exchange for the tribes contributing a share of the revenue to the State of California. Whelan held that Schwarzenegger had the power to enter into compacts with the tribes on behalf of California.
- In 2020, Whelan presided over the criminal case of Duncan D. Hunter, who pleaded guilty to conspiracy to steal $150,000 in his campaign funds for personal use. Whelan sentenced Hunter to 11 months in prison.

== Sources ==
Legal offices
Preceded by John Skylstead Rhoades Sr.	Judge of the United States District Court for the Southern District of California; 1998–2010	Succeeded by Gonzalo P. Curiel
