= Fletcher Mathews Haight =

American judge

Judge of the United States District Court for the Southern District of California
- In office August 5, 1861 – February 23, 1866
- Appointed by: Abraham Lincoln
- Preceded by: Isaac Stockton Keith Ogier
- Succeeded by: Seat abolished

Personal details
- Born: Fletcher Mathews Haight; November 28, 1799 Elmira, New York
- Died: February 23, 1866 (aged 66) San Francisco, California
- Children: Henry Huntly Haight
- Education: read law

Fletcher Mathews Haight (November 28, 1799 – February 23, 1866) was a United States district judge of the United States District Court for the Southern District of California.

== Education and career ==
Haight was born in Elmira, New York, on November 28, 1799, to General Samuel S. Haight and Sarah Mathews. Sarah was the daughter of James Mathews of Orange County, New York. The Mathews family, which included Haight's great uncles such as namesake Fletcher Mathews as well as New York City Mayor David Mathews, were notorious Loyalists during the American Revolution.

Haight read law to enter the bar in 1820. He was in private practice from 1820 to 1834 in Bath, New York, and then in Rochester, New York, also serving as Mayor of Rochester. Haight was a member of the New York State Assembly in 1833, and was President of the City Bank of Rochester from 1834 to 1835, thereafter returning to private practice in Rochester until 1846, when he began the first phase of his journey west. He was in private practice in St. Louis, Missouri from 1846 to 1854. He resumed his travels west and was in private practice in San Francisco, California from 1854 to 1861.

== Federal judicial service ==
Haight was nominated by President Abraham Lincoln on August 5, 1861, to a seat on the United States District Court for the Southern District of California vacated by Judge Isaac Stockton Keith Ogier. Haight's nomination was made on the advice of Attorney General of the United States Edward Bates. He was confirmed by the United States Senate on August 5, 1861, and received his commission the same day. His service terminated on February 23, 1866, due to his death in San Francisco.

== Family ==
Haight's son, Henry Huntly Haight, was the 10th governor of California.

== Sources ==
Legal offices
Preceded by Isaac Stockton Keith Ogier	Judge of the United States District Court for the Southern District of California; 1861–1866	Succeeded by Seat abolished
