= United States District Court for the Southern District of California =

U.S. federal district court in California

- (S.D. Cal.)
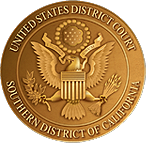

- The district's jurisdiction by county
- Location: Edward J. Schwartz U.S. Courthouse (San Diego) More locations: James M. Carter and Judith N. Keep U.S. Courthouse (San Diego); El Centro
- Appeals to: Ninth Circuit
- Established: August 5, 1886
- Judges: 13
- Chief Judge: Cynthia Bashant

Officers of the court
- U.S. Attorney: Adam Gordon
- U.S. Marshal: Steven C. Stafford
- www.casd.uscourts.gov

The United States District Court for the Southern District of California (in case citations, S.D. Cal.) is a federal court in the Ninth Circuit (except for patent claims and claims against the U.S. government under the Tucker Act, which are appealed to the Federal Circuit).

The District was created on September 28, 1850, following the passage of the California Statehood Act on September 9, 1850. The state was divided into a Northern and Southern district. The Judicial Circuits Act of 1866 abolished the Northern and Southern districts, re-organizing California as a single circuit district. On August 5, 1886 the Southern district was re-established, following the division of the state into Northern and Southern districts. The district was further divided on March 18, 1966 with the creation of the Central and Eastern districts.

The United States Attorney's Office for the Southern District of California represents the United States in civil and criminal litigation in the court. As of April 11, 2025 the United States attorney is Adam Gordon.

== Organization of the court ==
The United States District Court for the Southern District of California is one of four federal district courts in California. Court for the District is held at El Centro and the Edward J. Schwartz U.S. Courthouse and U.S. Courthouse Annex in San Diego. The district comprises Imperial and San Diego counties.

== Current judges ==
As of April 2, 2026:

#	Title	Judge	Duty station	Born	Term of service			Appointed by
#	Title	Judge	Duty station	Born	Active	Chief	Senior	Appointed by
67	Chief Judge	Cynthia Bashant	San Diego	1960	2014–present	2025–present	—	Obama
58	District Judge	Dana Sabraw	San Diego	1958	2003–present	2021–2025	—	G.W. Bush
62	District Judge	Janis Lynn Sammartino	San Diego	1950	2007–present	—	—	G.W. Bush
65	District Judge	Cathy Ann Bencivengo	San Diego	1958	2012–present	—	—	Obama
68	District Judge	Todd W. Robinson	San Diego	1967	2020–present	—	—	Trump
69	District Judge	Linda Lopez	San Diego	1968	2021–present	—	—	Biden
70	District Judge	Jinsook Ohta	San Diego	1976	2021–present	—	—	Biden
71	District Judge	Ruth Bermudez Montenegro	San Diego	1967	2022–present	—	—	Biden
72	District Judge	Robert S. Huie	San Diego	1976	2022–present	—	—	Biden
73	District Judge	Andrew G. Schopler	San Diego	1971	2023–present (Note: By virtue of his seniority of age, Judge Schopler holds seniority over Judge Simmons despite their identical commission dates.)	—	—	Biden
74	District Judge	James E. Simmons Jr.	San Diego	1979	2023–present	—	—	Biden
75	District Judge	Benjamin J. Cheeks	San Diego	1977	2025–present	—	—	Biden
76	District Judge	vacant	—	—	—	—	—	—
50	Senior Judge	Marilyn L. Huff	San Diego	1951	1991–2016	1998–2005	2016–present	G.H.W. Bush
53	Senior Judge	Barry Ted Moskowitz	San Diego	1950	1995–2019	2012–2019	2019–present	Clinton
54	Senior Judge	Jeffrey T. Miller	San Diego	1943	1997–2010	—	2010–present	Clinton
55	Senior Judge	Thomas J. Whelan	San Diego	1940	1998–2010	—	2010–present	Clinton
56	Senior Judge	M. James Lorenz	San Diego	1935	1999–2009	—	2009–present	Clinton
59	Senior Judge	William Q. Hayes	San Diego	1956	2003–2021	—	2021–present	G.W. Bush
60	Senior Judge	John A. Houston	San Diego	1952	2003–2018	—	2018–present	G.W. Bush
63	Senior Judge	Michael Anello	San Diego	1943	2008–2018	—	2018–present	G.W. Bush
64	Senior Judge	Anthony J. Battaglia	San Diego	1949	2011–2021	—	2021–present	Obama
66	Senior Judge	Gonzalo P. Curiel	San Diego	1953	2012–2023	—	2023–present	Obama

== Vacancies and pending nominations ==
Seat	Prior judge's duty station	Seat last held by	Vacancy reason	Date of vacancy	Nominee	Date of nomination
23	San Diego	William Q. Hayes	Senior status	August 1, 2021	—	—

== Former judges ==
#	Judge	Born–died	Active service	Chief Judge	Senior status	Appointed by	Reason for termination
1	James McHall Jones	1823–1851	1850–1851	—	—	Fillmore	death
2	Ogden Hoffman Jr.	1822–1891	1852–1854 (Note: Jointly appointed to the Northern and Southern Districts of California.)	—	—	Fillmore/Operation of law	reassignment
3	Isaac Stockton Keith Ogier	1819–1861	1854–1861	—	—	Pierce	death
4	Fletcher Mathews Haight	1799–1866	1861–1866	—	—	Lincoln	death
5	Erskine Mayo Ross	1845–1928	1887–1895	—	—	Cleveland	elevation
6	Olin Wellborn	1843–1921	1895–1915	—	—	Cleveland	retirement
7	Benjamin Franklin Bledsoe	1874–1938	1914–1925	—	—	Wilson	resignation
8	Oscar A. Trippet	1856–1923	1915–1923	—	—	Wilson	death
9	William P. James	1870–1940	1923–1940	—	—	Harding	death
10	Paul John McCormick	1879–1960	1924–1951	1948–1951	1951–1960	Coolidge	death
11	Edward J. Henning	1868–1937	1925–1929 (Note: Recess appointment; formally nominated on December 8, 1925, confirmed by the United States Senate on December 15, 1925, and received commission on December 15, 1925.)	—	—	Coolidge	resignation
12	George Cosgrave	1870–1945	1930–1940	—	1940–1945	Hoover	death
13	Harry Aaron Hollzer	1880–1946	1931–1946	—	—	Hoover	death
14	Albert Lee Stephens Sr.	1874–1965	1935–1937	—	—	F. Roosevelt	elevation
15	Leon Rene Yankwich	1888–1975	1935–1964	1951–1959	1964–1966	F. Roosevelt	reassignment
16	Ralph E. Jenney	1883–1945	1937–1945	—	—	F. Roosevelt	death
17	Campbell E. Beaumont	1883–1954	1939–1954	—	—	F. Roosevelt	death
18	Benjamin Harrison	1888–1960	1940–1960	1959	—	F. Roosevelt	death
19	James O'Connor	1886–1949	1940–1949	—	—	F. Roosevelt	death
20	Peirson Mitchell Hall	1894–1979	1942–1966	1959–1964	—	F. Roosevelt	reassignment
21	William Carey Mathes	1899–1967	1945–1965	1964–1965	1965–1967	Truman	death
22	Jacob Weinberger	1882–1974	1946–1958	—	1958–1974	Truman	death
23	James Marshall Carter	1904–1979	1949–1967	1966–1967	—	Truman	elevation
24	Harry Clay Westover	1894–1983	1949–1965	—	1965–1983	Truman	death
25	William Matthew Byrne Sr.	1896–1974	1950–1966 (Note: Recess appointment; formally nominated on November 27, 1950, confirmed by the Senate on December 13, 1950, and received commission on December 21, 1950.)	1965–1966	1966	Truman	reassignment
26	Ernest Allen Tolin	1904–1961	1951–1961 (Note: Recess appointment; formally nominated on March 3, 1952, confirmed by the Senate on June 10, 1952, and received commission on June 11, 1952.)	—	—	Truman	death
27	Gilbert H. Jertberg	1897–1973	1955–1958	—	—	Eisenhower	elevation
28	Thurmond Clarke	1902–1971	1955–1966	1966	—	Eisenhower	reassignment
29	Fred Kunzel	1901–1969	1959–1969	1967–1969	—	Eisenhower	death
30	Myron Donovan Crocker	1915–2010	1959–1966	—	—	Eisenhower	reassignment
31	Albert Lee Stephens Jr.	1913–2001	1961–1966	—	—	Kennedy	reassignment
32	Charles Hardy Carr	1903–1976	1962–1966	—	—	Kennedy	reassignment
33	Jesse William Curtis Jr.	1905–2008	1962–1966	—	—	Kennedy	reassignment
34	Elisha Avery Crary	1905–1978	1962–1966	—	—	Kennedy	reassignment
35	Francis C. Whelan	1907–1991	1964–1966	—	—	L. Johnson	reassignment
36	Irving Hill	1915–1998	1965–1966	—	—	L. Johnson	reassignment
37	A. Andrew Hauk	1912–2004	1966	—	—	L. Johnson	reassignment
38	William Percival Gray	1912–1992	1966	—	—	L. Johnson	reassignment
39	Edward Joseph Schwartz	1912–2000	1968–1982	1969–1982	1982–2000	L. Johnson	death
40	Howard Boyd Turrentine	1914–2010	1970–1984	1982–1984	1984–2010	Nixon	death
41	Gordon Thompson Jr.	1929–2015	1970–1994	1984–1991	1994–2015	Nixon	death
42	J. Clifford Wallace	1928–present	1970–1972	—	—	Nixon	elevation
43	Leland Chris Nielsen	1919–1999	1971–1985	—	1985–1999	Nixon	death
44	William Benner Enright	1925–2020	1972–1990	—	1990–2020	Nixon	death
45	Judith Keep	1944–2004	1980–2004	1991–1998	—	Carter	death
46	Earl Ben Gilliam	1931–2001	1980–1993	—	1993–2001	Carter	death
47	J. Lawrence Irving	1935–2024	1982–1990	—	—	Reagan	resignation
48	Rudi M. Brewster	1932–2012	1984–1998	—	1998–2012	Reagan	death
49	John Skylstead Rhoades Sr.	1925–2007	1985–1995	—	1995–2007	Reagan	death
51	Irma Elsa Gonzalez	1948–present	1992–2013	2005–2012	2013	G.H.W. Bush	retirement
52	Napoleon A. Jones Jr.	1940–2009	1994–2007	—	2007–2009	Clinton	death
57	Larry Alan Burns	1954–present	2003–2021	2019–2021	2021–2024	G.W. Bush	retirement
61	Roger Benitez	1950–present	2004–2017	—	2017–2026	G.W. Bush	retirement

== Chief judges ==
Chief judges have administrative responsibilities with respect to their district court. Unlike the Supreme Court, where one justice is specifically nominated to be chief, the office of chief judge rotates among the district court judges. To be chief, a judge must have been in active service on the court for at least one year, be under the age of 65, and have not previously served as chief judge.

A vacancy is filled by the judge highest in seniority among the group of qualified judges. The chief judge serves for a term of seven years, or until age 70, whichever occurs first. The age restrictions are waived if no members of the court would otherwise be qualified for the position.

When the office was created in 1948, the chief judge was the longest-serving judge who had not elected to retire, on what has since 1958 been known as senior status, or declined to serve as chief judge. After August 6, 1959, judges could not become or remain chief after turning 70 years old. The current rules have been in operation since October 1, 1982.

== Succession of seats ==
Seat 1
Seat established on September 28, 1850 by 9 Stat. 521
J. Jones	1850–1851
Seat abolished on August 31, 1852 by 10 Stat. 76, 84
Seat reestablished on January 18, 1854 by 10 Stat. 265
Ogier	1854–1861
Haight	1861–1866
Seat abolished on July 27, 1866 by 14 Stat. 300
Seat reestablished on August 5, 1886 by 24 Stat. 308
Ross	1887–1895
Wellborn	1895–1915
Trippet	1915–1923
McCormick	1924–1951
Tolin	1952–1961
Crary	1962–1966
Seat reassigned to Central District on September 18, 1966 by 80 Stat. 75

Seat 2
Seat assigned on August 31, 1852 by 10 Stat. 76, 84 (concurrent with Northern District)
Hoffman, Jr.	1852–1854
Seat reassigned solely to Northern District on January 18, 1854 by 10 Stat. 265

Seat 3
Seat established on July 30, 1914 by 38 Stat. 580
Bledsoe	1914–1925
Henning	1925–1929
Cosgrave	1930–1940
Hall	1942–1966
Seat reassigned to Central District on September 18, 1966 by 80 Stat. 75

Seat 4
Seat established on September 14, 1922 by 42 Stat. 837 (temporary)
Seat made permanent on August 19, 1935 by 49 Stat. 659
James	1923–1940
O'Connor	1940–1949
Byrne, Sr.	1950–1966
Hauk	1966
Seat reassigned to Central District on September 18, 1966 by 80 Stat. 75

Seat 5
Seat established on July 27, 1930 by 46 Stat. 819
Hollzer	1931–1946
Weinberger	1946–1958
Kunzel	1959–1969
Turrentine	1970–1984
Brewster	1984–1998
Lorenz	1999–2009
Battaglia	2011–2021
Simmons, Jr.	2023–present

Seat 6
Seat established on August 2, 1935 by 49 Stat. 508
A.L. Stephens, Sr.	1935–1937
Jenney	1937–1945
Mathes	1945–1965
Hill	1965–1966
Seat reassigned to Central District on September 18, 1966 by 80 Stat. 75

Seat 7
Seat established on August 2, 1935 by 49 Stat. 508
Yankwich	1935–1964
F. Whelan	1964–1966
Seat reassigned to Central District on September 18, 1966 by 80 Stat. 75

Seat 8
Seat established on May 31, 1938 by 52 Stat. 584, 585
Beaumont	1939–1954
Jertberg	1955–1958
Crocker	1959–1966
Seat reassigned to Eastern District on September 18, 1966 by 80 Stat. 75

Seat 9
Seat established on May 24, 1940 by 54 Stat. 219, 220
Harrison	1940–1960
A.L. Stephens, Jr.	1961–1966
Seat reassigned to Central District on September 18, 1966 by 80 Stat. 75

Seat 10
Seat established on August 3, 1949 by 63 Stat. 493
Westover	1949–1965
Gray	1966
Seat reassigned to Central District on September 18, 1966 by 80 Stat. 75

Seat 11
Seat established on August 3, 1949 by 63 Stat. 493
Carter	1949–1967
Schwartz	1968–1982
Irving	1982–1990
Gonzalez	1992–2013
Bashant	2014–present

Seat 12
Seat established on February 10, 1954 by 68 Stat. 8
Clarke	1955–1966
Seat reassigned to Central District on September 18, 1966 by 80 Stat. 75

Seat 13
Seat established on May 19, 1961 by 75 Stat. 80
Carr	1962–1966
Seat reassigned to Central District on September 18, 1966 by 80 Stat. 75

Seat 14
Seat established on May 19, 1961 by 75 Stat. 80
Curtis, Jr.	1962–1966
Seat reassigned to Central District on September 18, 1966 by 80 Stat. 75

Seat 15
Seat established on June 2, 1970 by 84 Stat. 294
Wallace	1970–1972
Enright	1972–1990
Huff	1991–2016
Robinson	2020–present

Seat 16
Seat established on June 2, 1970 by 84 Stat. 294
Thompson, Jr.	1970–1994
Miller	1997–2010
Bencivengo	2012–present

Seat 17
Seat established on June 2, 1970 by 84 Stat. 294
Nielsen	1971–1985
Rhoades, Sr.	1985–1995
T. Whelan	1998–2010
Curiel	2012–2023
Cheeks	2025–present

Seat 18
Seat established on October 20, 1978 by 92 Stat. 1629
Keep	1980–2004
Sammartino	2007–present

Seat 19
Seat established on October 20, 1978 by 92 Stat. 1629
Gilliam	1980–1993
N. Jones, Jr.	1994–2007
Anello	2008–2018
Huie	2022–present

Seat 20
Seat established on December 1, 1990 by 104 Stat. 5089
Moskowitz	1995–2019
Ohta	2021–present

Seat 21
Seat established on November 2, 2002 by 116 Stat. 1758
Burns	2003–2021
Schopler	2023–present

Seat 22
Seat established on November 2, 2002 by 116 Stat. 1758
Sabraw	2003–present

Seat 23
Seat established on November 2, 2002 by 116 Stat. 1758
Hayes	2003–2021
vacant	2021–present

Seat 24
Seat established on November 2, 2002 by 116 Stat. 1758
Houston	2003–2018
Montenegro	2022–present

Seat 25
Seat established on November 2, 2002 by 116 Stat. 1758
Benitez	2004–2017
Lopez	2021–present

== List of U.S. attorneys ==
The U.S. Attorney is the chief law-enforcement officer for the district.

- J. M. Jones (1850)
- Alfred Wheeler (1851–1853)
- Isaac S. K. Ogier (1853–1854)
- Pacificus Ord (1854–1858)
- J. R. Gitchell (1858–1861)
- Kimball H. Dimmick (1861)
- Billington C. Whiting (1861)
- J. Marion Brooks (1887–1888)
- George J. Davis (1888–1889)
- Aurelius W. Hutton (1889–1890)
- Willoughby Cole (1890–1892)
- Matthew J. Allen (1892–1893)
- George J. Denis (1893–1897)
- Frank P. Flint (1897–1901)
- L. H. Valentine (1901–1905)
- Oscar Lawler (1905–1909)
- Aloysuis McCormick (1909–1913)
- Albert Schoonover (1913–1917)
- John R. O'Connor (1917–1921)
- Joseph C. Burke (1921–1925)
- Samuel W. McNabb (1925–1933)
- John R. Layng (1933)
- Pierson M. Hall (1933–1937)
- Benjamin Harrison (1937–1940)
- William F. Palmer (1940–1942)
- Leo W. Silverstein (1942–1943)
- Charles H. Carr (1943–1946)
- James M. Carter (1946–1949)
- Ernest A. Tolin (1949–1951)
- Walter S. Binns (1951–1953)
- Laughlin E. Waters (1953–1961)
- Francis C. Whelan (1961–1964)
- Thomas R. Sheridan (1964)
- Manuel L. Real (1964–1966)
- Edwin L. Miller Jr. (1966–1969)
- Harry D. Steward (1969–1975)
- Terry J. Knoepp (1975–1977)
- Michael J. Walsh (1977–1980)
- M. James Lorenz (1980–1981)
- William H. Kennedy (1981–1982)
- Peter K. Nunez (1982–1988)
- William Braniff (1988–1993)
- Alan Bersin (1993-1998)
- Charles La Bella (1998-1999)
- Greg Vega (1999-2001)
- Patrick O’Toole (acting 2001-2002)
- Carol Lam (2002-2007)
- Karen Hewitt (2007-2010)
- Laura Duffy (2010-2017)
- Robert S. Brewer Jr. (2019-2021)
- Randy Grossman (2021-2023)
- Tara McGrath (2023-2025)

== See also ==
- Courts of California
- List of current United States district judges
- List of United States federal courthouses in California
