= Rudi M. Brewster =

American judge

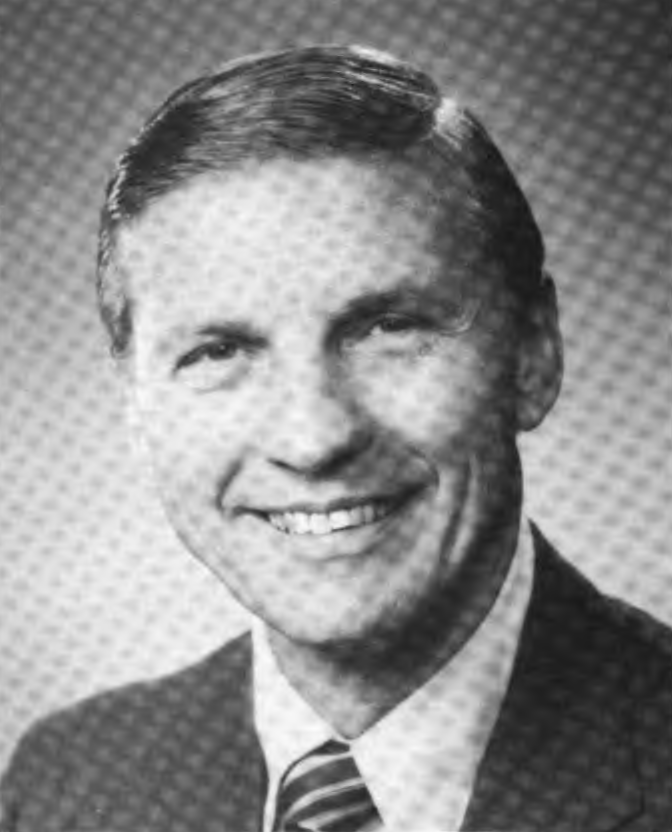

Senior Judge of the United States District Court for the Southern District of California
- In office July 1, 1998 – September 7, 2012

Judge of the United States District Court for the Southern District of California
- In office June 15, 1984 – July 1, 1998
- Appointed by: Ronald Reagan
- Preceded by: Howard Boyd Turrentine
- Succeeded by: M. James Lorenz

Personal details
- Born: Rudi Milton Brewster; May 18, 1932 Sioux Falls, South Dakota, U.S.
- Died: September 7, 2012 (aged 80) La Jolla, California, U.S.
- Education: Princeton University (A.B.); Stanford Law School (J.D.)

Rudi Milton Brewster (May 18, 1932 – September 7, 2012) was a United States district judge of the United States District Court for the Southern District of California, best known for 2006 ruling in a patent infringements suit against Microsoft tied to the licensing of the MP3 format.

== Education and career ==
Born in Sioux Falls, South Dakota, Brewster received an A.B. from the Woodrow Wilson School of Public and International Affairs at Princeton University in 1954 after completing a 130-page long senior thesis titled "The Economic Section, Antitrust Division: Analysis of Purposes and Functions." While a student at Princeton, Brewster was a member of the Navy ROTC program. He served in the United States Navy as an aviator from 1954 to 1957, and thereafter attended Stanford Law School while in the United States Naval Reserve. He earned a Juris Doctor from Stanford Law School in 1960, and went into private practice in San Diego, California, at the law firm of Gray, Cary, Ames & Frye (now a part of DLA Piper). He left the Naval Reserve in 1981.

== Federal judicial service ==
On May 24, 1984, President Ronald Reagan nominated Brewster to the United States District Court for the Southern District of California, to a seat vacated by Judge Howard B. Turrentine. He was confirmed by the United States Senate on June 15, 1984, and received commission the same day. He took his oath of office on June 29, 1984. He assumed senior status on July 1, 1998, serving in that status until his death of complications of pneumonia on September 7, 2012, in La Jolla, California.

== Notable cases ==
Brewster tossed out a February 2006 ruling against Microsoft for patent infringements tied to the licensing of the MP3 format, worth $1.5 billion.

== Sources ==
Legal offices
Preceded by Howard Boyd Turrentine	Judge of the United States District Court for the Southern District of California; 1984–1998	Succeeded by M. James Lorenz
