= Lighthiser v. Trump =

United States District Court case

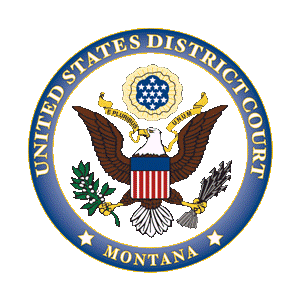
- Court: United States District Court for the District of Montana, Butte Division
- Full case name: Lighthiser et al. v. Trump et al.
- Decided: October 15, 2025 (District court)

Court membership
- Judge sitting: Dana L. Christensen

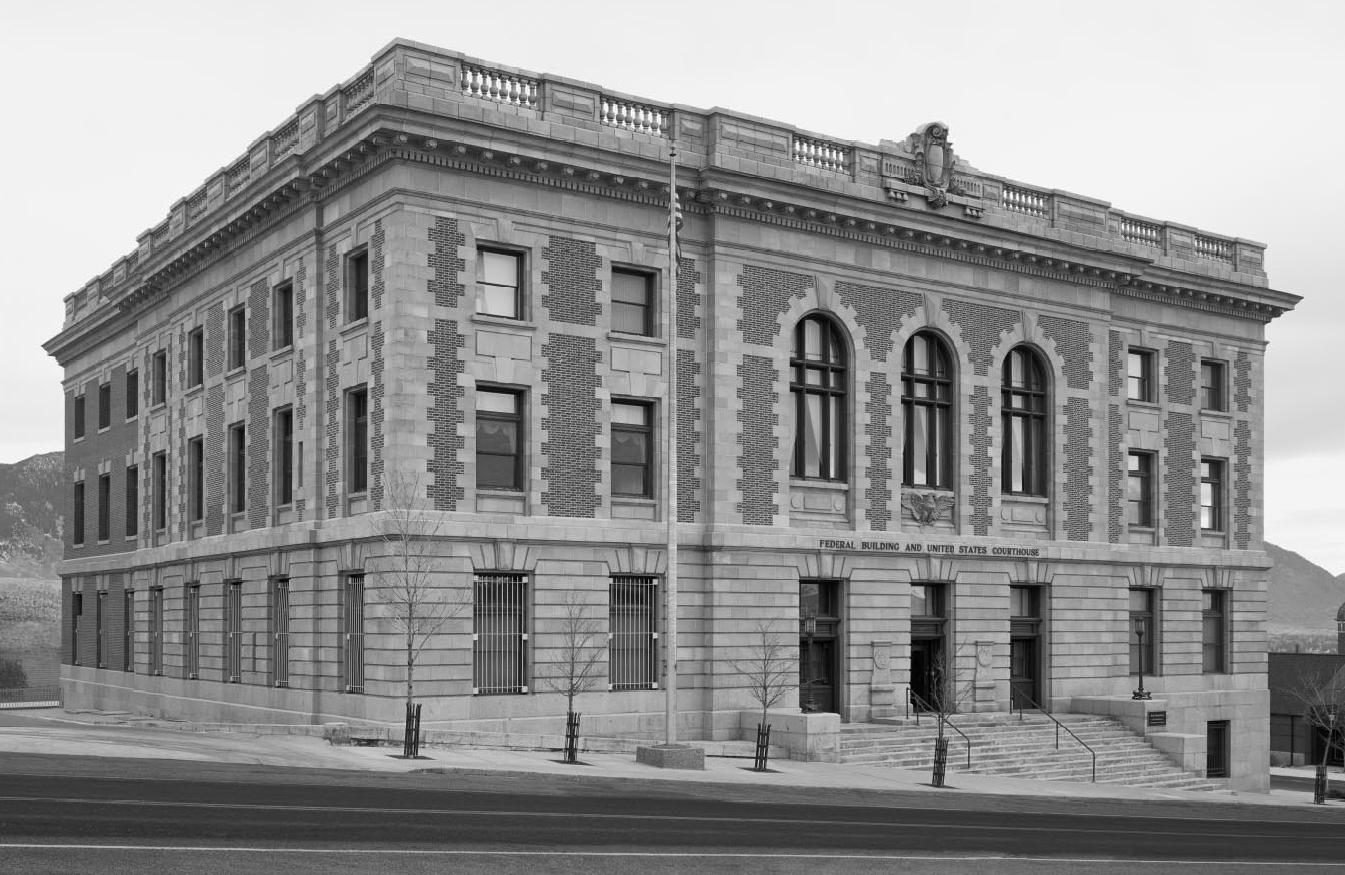
The Mike Mansfield Federal Building and U.S. Courthouse in Butte, Montana

Lighthiser v. Trump is an environmental and climate change-related lawsuit that was filed in May 2025 in U.S. district court by Our Children's Trust on behalf of 22 youth plaintiffs, seeking revocation of certain executive orders of U.S. President Trump that favored fossil fuels over renewable energy and climate science. In October 2025, a US district court dismissed the case for lack of jurisdiction while acknowledging the effects of climate change on children.

== Background and history ==
On December 18, 2024, Montana's Supreme Court upheld a county court ruling in favor of youth plaintiffs in Held v. Montana. Interpreting the Montana state constitution, the Held court ruled that a certain Montana law "violates Youth Plaintiffs' right to a clean and healthful environment and is unconstitutional on its face". On May 29, 2025, Lighthiser was filed in the federal district court in Butte, Montana, 68 miles (109 km) from the Held venue in Helena. The 22 Lighthiser plaintiffs, ages 7–25, included ten plaintiffs from the Held suit, and some of the plaintiffs in Juliana v. United States which was dismissed for lack of standing almost a decade after being filed.

The Lighthiser complaint named as defendants, President Donald Trump, several cabinet secretaries and numerous executive agencies, saying they are engaging in unlawful executive overreach. The plaintiffs argued that three of Trump's orders "amount to a wholesale attack on clean renewable energy and climate science—escalating the climate emergency" and violating their Fifth Amendment right to life and liberty. (Note: The Fifth Amendment states "No person shall be held to answer for a capital, or otherwise infamous crime, unless on a presentment or indictment of a Grand Jury, except in cases arising in the land or naval forces, or in the Militia, when in actual service in time of War or public danger; nor shall any person be subject for the same offence to be twice put in jeopardy of life or limb; nor shall be compelled in any criminal case to be a witness against himself, nor be deprived of life, liberty, or property, without due process of law; nor shall private property be taken for public use, without just compensation." (emphasis added)) Specifically, plaintiffs refer to Trump's executive orders declaring "a national energy emergency", boosting production of "American energy", and reinvigorating "America’s beautiful, clean coal industry".

A May 29, 2025 Trump administration communication asserted that "the American people are more concerned with the future generations' economic and national security" and that "future generations should not have to foot the bill for the left's radical climate agenda". The Department of Justice and intervenors from 18 state governments and Guam asked for the case to be dismissed.

== Legal principles ==
The Lighthiser complaint argues that Trump acted beyond his legally granted powers (ultra vires) to "unleash" fossil fuel pollution and "debilitate" the Environmental Protection Agency, to "terminate" the Congressionally mandated National Climate Assessment, "dismantling, suppressing and scrubbing" science on government websites, and violating the state-created danger (Note: The state-created danger doctrine is conceived to prevent a government from causing injury to its citizens by its own actions. —Noor, Dharna (May 29, 2025). "Trump violating right to life with anti-environment orders, youth lawsuit says". The Guardian. Archived from the original on May 31, 2025.) doctrine.^{:pp. ii and 95-118.}

Lighthiser is a federal case relying on principles in the US Constitution, and thus cannot rely on the Montana constitution's right to "a clean and healthful environment" underlying the Held victory. Unlike Juliana v. United States which tried—unsuccessfully—to force the federal government to change the country's energy system, the Lighthiser plaintiffs merely seek revocation of Trump's executive orders. (Note: The Prayer for Relief (pp. 119-120 of the complaint) sought: a declaration that Trump's executive orders and any implementing executive actions are unlawful, unconstitutional, ultra vires, and invalid; a permanent injunction prohibiting implementation or enforcement of the orders; a permanent injunction requiring that defendants rescind all agencywide directives applying, implementing, and effectuating the orders; award of lawsuit-related costs to plaintiffs.)

Plaintiffs must prove that they have been harmed, that their harm was caused by Trump's orders ("traceability"), and that the court has the power to address that harm ("redressability"). Whereas Juliana was dismissed in part because of a lack of redressability (inability of a court to force federal adoption of a climate policy), the Lighthiser plaintiffs merely ask the court to declare Trump's executive orders to be unconstitutional violations of the rights to life and liberty. The traceability and redressability standards raise questions about the separation of powers between branches of the US government.

== Ruling and appeal ==
After a two-day hearing in September, on October 15, 2025, the US District Court for the District of Montana, Butte Division, granted Trump's motion to dismiss the case for lack of jurisdiction. Preliminarily, the court's order acknowledged that "plaintiffs have presented overwhelming evidence that the climate is changing at a staggering pace" and that the "record further demonstrates that climate change and the exposure from fossil fuels presents a children’s health emergency". The order went on to state that while it "is certainly troubled by the very real harms presented by climate change and the challenged [executive orders'] effect on carbon dioxide emissions, this concern does not automatically confer upon it the power to act... [and that] with this understanding in mind, the Court reluctantly concludes... that it cannot grant Plaintiffs the relief they seek". The court applied the precedent in Juliana v. United States in ruling that the court could not redress plaintiffs' harm, noting the unworkability of requiring a court to review every climate-related agency action after Trump's inauguration. The court explained that, instead, "Plaintiffs’ compelling case for redress must be made to the political branches or to the electorate".

Expressing pleasure immediately after the ruling, Montana Attorney General Austin Knudsen described the case as "plaintiffs’ request to force the Trump Administration to revert to Biden’s nonsensical and unpopular policies" and as "just another show trial contrived by climate activists who wasted the taxpayer’s money". Our Children’s Trust said it plans to pursue an expedited appeal to the Ninth Circuit Court of Appeals.

In April 2026, the plaintiffs argued in an appeal before the US Court of Appeals for the Ninth Circuit in Portand, Oregon, that the case had been wrongfully dismissed.

== Context and impact ==
Some legal scholars said that "no other U.S. court decision has gone this far" in explicitly acknowledging the effects of climate change on children, and that the judge's written order provided "very detailed guidance for designing cases that can overcome the challenges this one faced". Conversely, another scholar described a legal risk that an appeal could result in a stronger decision against the plaintiffs that could be affirmed by the US Supreme Court, affecting challenges to presidential executive orders generally.
