= Our Children's Trust =

American nonprofit climate law firm

- Formation: Tax-exempt since June 2011; 15 years ago
- Headquarters: Eugene, Oregon
- Executive Director: Julia A Olson
- Revenue: 4,964,407 USD (2023)
- Expenses: 5,277,623 USD (2023)
- Website: ourchildrenstrust.org

Our Children's Trust is an American nonprofit public interest law firm based in Oregon that has filed several lawsuits on behalf of youth plaintiffs against state and federal governments, arguing that they are infringing on the youths' rights to a safe climate system.

== History ==
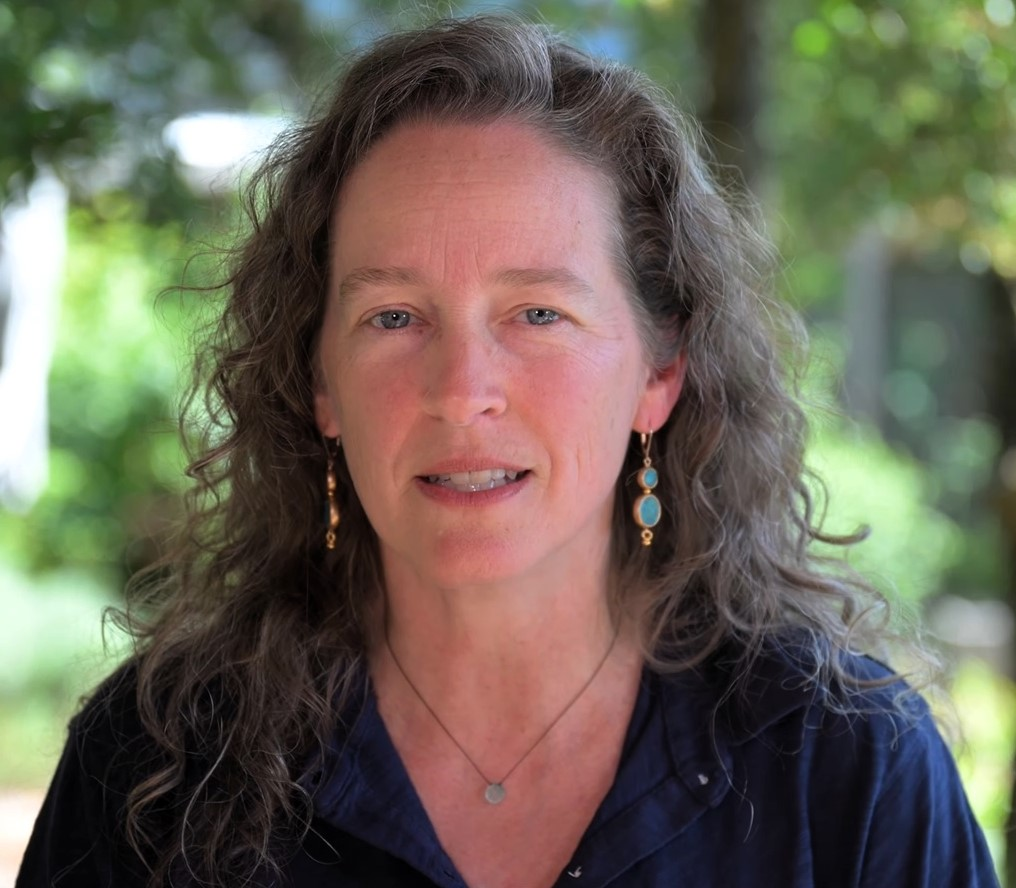
Julia Olson, founder, in 2023

Our Children's Trust was founded by attorney Julia Olson in 2010 to help formulate legal cases under the public trust doctrine and state and federal constitutions. Olson established the non-profit with advice and assistance from Mary Christina Wood, director of the Environmental and Natural Resources Law Program at the University of Oregon, who created the concept of "Atmospheric Trust Litigation" to take legal action to hold governments accountable for their role in causing climate change. Part of Our Children's Trust's inspiration was from Antonio Oposa's work in the Philippines. The law firm exclusively represents children in constitutional lawsuits to hold government entities accountable for actions causing and worsening climate change.

== Legal Actions ==
Global warming—the progression from cooler historical temperatures (blue) to recent warmer temperatures (red)—is being experienced disproportionately by younger generations. Various lawsuits are based on the constitutional rights of younger and future generations.

Successive generations are predicted to experience progressively greater unprecedented lifetime exposure (ULE) events such as heat waves. About 111 million children born in 2020 will live with unprecedented heatwave exposure in a world that warms by 3.5 °C, compared with 62 million with only 1.5 °C of warming.

Organized by Our Children's Trust, legal and administrative actions were filed against all 50 states and the federal government (Alec L. v. McCarthy) in May 2011. The filings were accompanied by the iMatter March, international solidarity youth marches empowering youth to stand up for their future in over 175 marches in 45 countries.

== Juliana v. United States ==
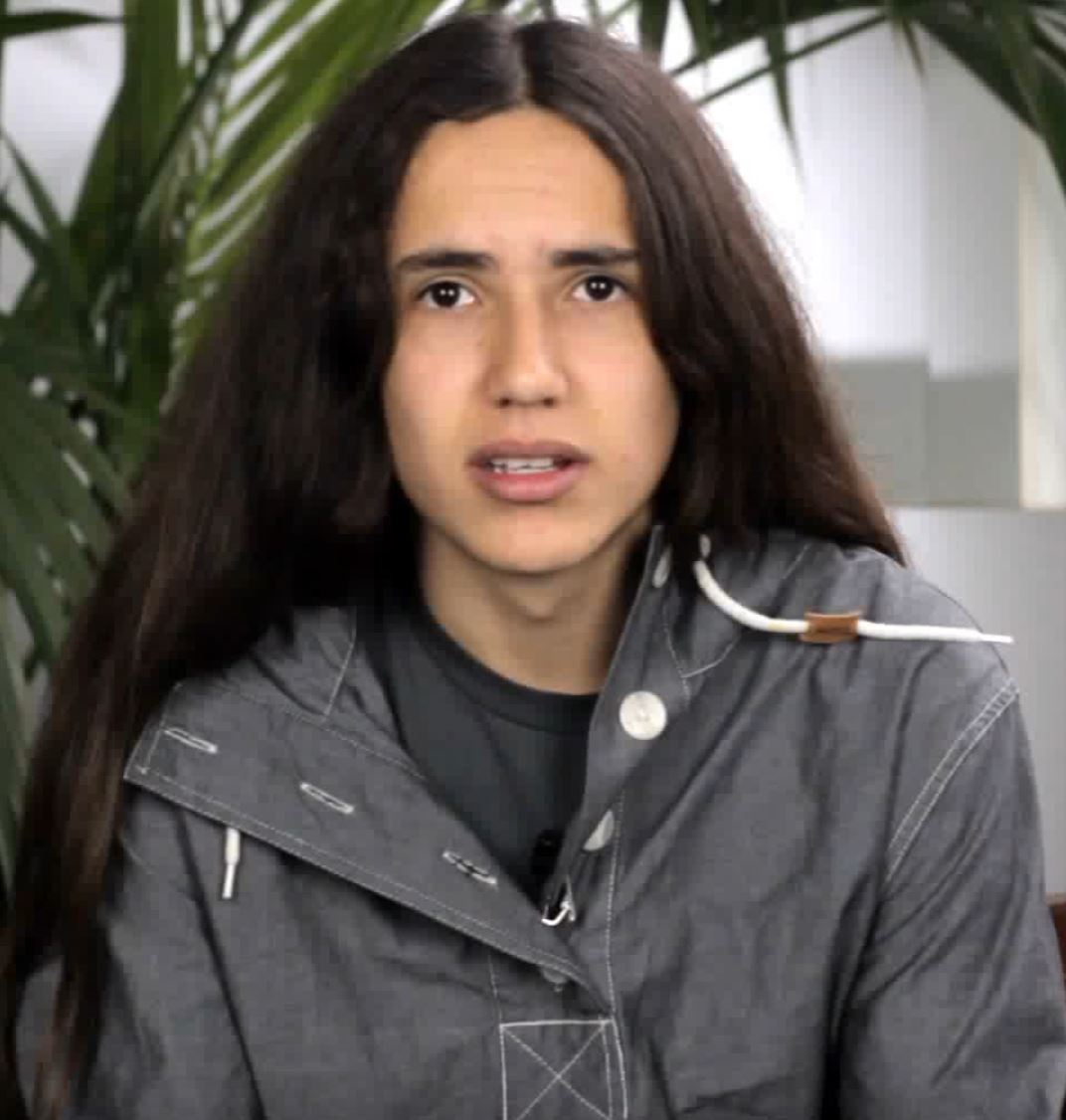
One of the plaintiffs, Xiuhtezcatl Martinez

Juliana, et al. v. United States of America, et al. was a constitutional climate lawsuit filed in 2015 that was being brought by 21 youth plaintiffs against the United States federal government and several of its executive branch agencies and officers, including former Presidents Donald Trump and Barack Obama. The plaintiffs, represented by Our Children's Trust, include Xiuhtezcatl Martinez, Vic Barrett and future generations represented by climatologist James Hansen. Some fossil fuel and industry groups were also initially named as defendants but were later dropped by a judge at their request.

The lawsuit asserts that, by operating and investing in a national energy system that causes climate change, the government violated the youths' constitutional rights to life, liberty, property, equal protection of the law, as well as substantially impaired essential public trust resources. The complaint details how each of the 21 plaintiffs are individually injured by their government's actions causing climate change and how the federal government has known of the dangers of climate change for decades, yet persisted in orchestrating a fossil-fuel based energy system. The 21 plaintiffs seek a declaration of their constitutional rights and a declaration that the U.S. national fossil fuel energy system violates their rights.

Juliana v. United States gained attention in 2016 when U.S. District Court of Oregon Judge Ann Aiken found, for the first time, that there is a fundamental right “to a climate system capable of sustaining human life" protected by the U.S. Constitution, allowing the case to proceed to trial.

The government has sought to delay and dismiss the case for various concerns. The case was scheduled to begin trial in the District Court on October 29, 2018, following the Supreme Court's and Ninth Circuit Court of Appeals’ initial denials of the government's requests to stay the case. Ultimately, the Supreme Court issued a stay days before trial was set to begin and the case went up to the Ninth Circuit Court of Appeals on interlocutory appeal.

The Ninth Circuit Court of Appeals heard oral arguments on June 4, 2019, in Portland, Oregon in front of a three-judge panel from the Ninth Circuit consisting of Mary H. Murguia, Andrew D. Hurwitz and Josephine Staton (sitting by assignment), all of whom had been appointed to the bench by President Barack Obama.

On January 17, 2020, in a 2-1 decision, the Ninth Circuit panel dismissed the case, without prejudice, on redressability grounds. To establish standing, the plaintiffs needed to show that they have injuries that are caused by the government and are redressable by the court. The majority opinion found that the District Court “correctly found the injury requirement met" and that the plaintiffs had provided sufficient evidence to show the government was a substantial factor in causing plaintiffs’ injuries. However, the panel dismissed the case without prejudice for lack of redressability because it concluded that the court lacked the power to order plaintiffs’ requested injunctive relief, which included an order requiring the government to prepare a remedial plan to transition the U.S. energy system off of fossil fuels.

Writing for the majority, Judge Hurwitz wrote that, while “a substantial evidentiary record documents that the federal government has long promoted fossil fuel use despite knowing that it can cause catastrophic climate change, and that failure to change existing policy may hasten an environmental apocalypse,” "it is beyond the power of an Article III court to order, design, supervise, or implement the plaintiffs' requested remedial plan. As the opinions of their experts make plain, any effective plan would necessarily require a host of complex policy decisions entrusted, for better or worse, to the wisdom and discretion of the executive and legislative branches." In dissent, Judge Staton stated, "It is as if an asteroid were barreling toward Earth and the government decided to shut down our only defenses. Seeking to quash this suit, the government bluntly insists that it has the absolute and unreviewable power to destroy the Nation. My colleagues throw up their hands. . . . No case can singlehandedly prevent the catastrophic effects of climate change predicted by the government and scientists . . . [but] the mere fact that this suit cannot alone halt climate change does not mean that it presents no claim suitable for judicial resolution."

In March 2020, attorneys for the plaintiffs filed a petition for rehearing en banc with the Ninth Circuit. The petition requested that a panel of 11 judges review January's divided opinion. Later that month, 24 members of the U.S. Congress, experts in the fields of constitutional law, climate change, and public health, and several leading women's, children's, environmental, and human rights organizations filed 10 amicus curiae (friend of the court) briefs in support of the plaintiffs, urging that the en banc petition be granted.

On February 10, 2021, the Ninth Circuit denied the Plaintiffs’ petition for en banc review. While a judge requested a vote on whether to rehear the case, a majority of the judges declined to do so.

On March 9, 2021, after the mandate was issued and the case was sent back to U.S. District Court, attorneys for the plaintiffs filed a motion to amend their complaint to limit the remedy sought in their case. Specifically, while the plaintiffs had originally requested both declaratory relief and for the court to order the government to create a climate recovery plan, they asked to eliminate injunctive relief, including the climate recovery plan, and instead to seek only declaratory relief.

On May 13, 2021, Judge Aiken ordered attorneys for the plaintiffs and the Department of Justice to convene for a settlement conference. During this time, Judge Aiken also scheduled oral arguments for the plaintiffs’ Motion for Leave to File Second Amended Complaint.

On June 8, 2021, 17 Republican Attorneys General filed a motion to insert themselves as intervenors in the case and to object to any potential settlement between the Biden administration and the plaintiffs. On July 7, 2021, six Democratic Attorneys General filed amicus briefs in support of the plaintiffs. On July 13, 2021, the NRDC filed an amicus brief in support of the plaintiffs.

In June 2023, the plaintiffs received permission to file an amended complaint. The government then moved to dismiss the amended complaint. In December 2023, the district court for the District of Oregon allowed the plaintiffs' claims of a right to a climate system capable of sustaining life under the Due Process Clause and violation of the Public Trust Doctrine to proceed. Once again, the government appealed.

The government requested the Ninth Circuit Court of Appeals to order the federal district court to dismiss the case. The petition was granted by the circuit court on May 1, 2024, and the district court then dismissed the case the same day.

In dismissing the case, the Ninth Circuit Court of Appeals (Circuit Judges Mark J. Bennett, Ryan D. Nelson and Eric D. Miller) wrote: In a 2020 appeal, "we held that the Juliana plaintiffs lack Article III standing to bring such a claim. We remanded with instructions to dismiss on that basis. The district court nevertheless allowed amendment, and the government again moved to dismiss. The district court denied that motion, and the government petitioned for mandamus seeking to enforce our earlier mandate. We have jurisdiction to consider the petition. We grant it."

The plaintiffs were supported by over two dozen of the world's pre-eminent climate scientists and supporters, including the late Dr. Frank Ackerman, Peter Erickson, Dr. Howard Frumkin, Dr. James Hansen, Dr. Ove Hoegh-Guldberg, Dr. Mark Jacobson, Dr. Akilah Jefferson (rebuttal), Dr. Susan Pacheco, Dr. Jerome Paulson, Dr. Eric Rignot, Dr. G. Philip Robertson, Dr. Steve Running, Catherine Smith, James "Gus" Speth, Nobel laureate Dr. Joseph Stiglitz, Dr. Kevin Trenberth, Dr. Lise Van Susteren, Dr. Karrie Walters (rebuttal), Dr. Harold Wanless, Dr. Jim Williams, and Andrea Wulf, all of whom prepared expert reports and were deposed in preparation for trial in 2018.

== Lawsuits against US States ==
Our Children's Trust has supported or represented youth in legal efforts in all 50 states by bringing legal actions including climate lawsuits and petitions for rulemaking against state governments. As of February 2023, Our Children's Trust represents and supports young people in active climate cases and legal actions in five U.S. states: Florida, Hawai’i, Montana, Utah, and Virginia:

- Petition for Rulemaking with the Florida Department of Agriculture and Consumer Services
- Navahine F. v. Hawai‘i Department of Transportation
- Held v. State of Montana
- Natalie R. v. State of Utah
- Layla H. v. Commonwealth of Virginia

The following is an incomplete list of additional lawsuits that have been filed by Our Children's Trust against U.S. states:

- Sagoonick v. State of Alaska
- Martinez v. Colorado Oil and Gas Conservation Commission
- Reynolds v. Florida
- Turner v. North Carolina Environmental Management Commission
- Aji P. v. Washington
- Kain v. Massachusetts Department of Environmental Protection
- Chernaik v. Brown

== Held v. Montana ==
Held v. Montana was filed by Our Children's Trust in March 2020 on behalf of 16 Montanan youths. The case alleges that by affirmatively promoting a fossil fuel-driven energy system, Montana is violating the constitutional rights of the youth to a clean and healthful environment. The lawsuit also claims that the state's fossil fuel energy system is contributing to the climate crisis and is degrading Montana's constitutionally protected public trust resources.

Attorneys for the youth plaintiffs presented oral arguments on the state's motion to dismiss on February 18, 2021. On August 4, 2021, a judge ruled in favor of the youth plaintiffs and denied the state's motion to dismiss. The trial began on June 12, 2023, being the first constitutional climate trial and first ever children's climate trial in U.S. history. On August 14, 2023, the trial court judge ruled in the youth plaintiffs' favor, though the state indicated it would appeal the decision. Montana's Supreme Court heard oral arguments on July 10, 2024, its seven justices taking the case under advisement. On December 18, 2024, the Montana Supreme Court upheld the county court ruling.

== Genesis B. v. EPA ==
In December 2023, Our Children's Trust filed Genesis B. v. EPA in the state of California.

== International lawsuits ==
The following is an incomplete list of non-U.S. places that Our Children's Trust has assisted in litigation:

- Canada
- India
- Pakistan
- Mexico
- Colombia
- The Philippines
- Uganda
