= Josephine Staton =

American judge (born 1961)

Josephine Laura Staton
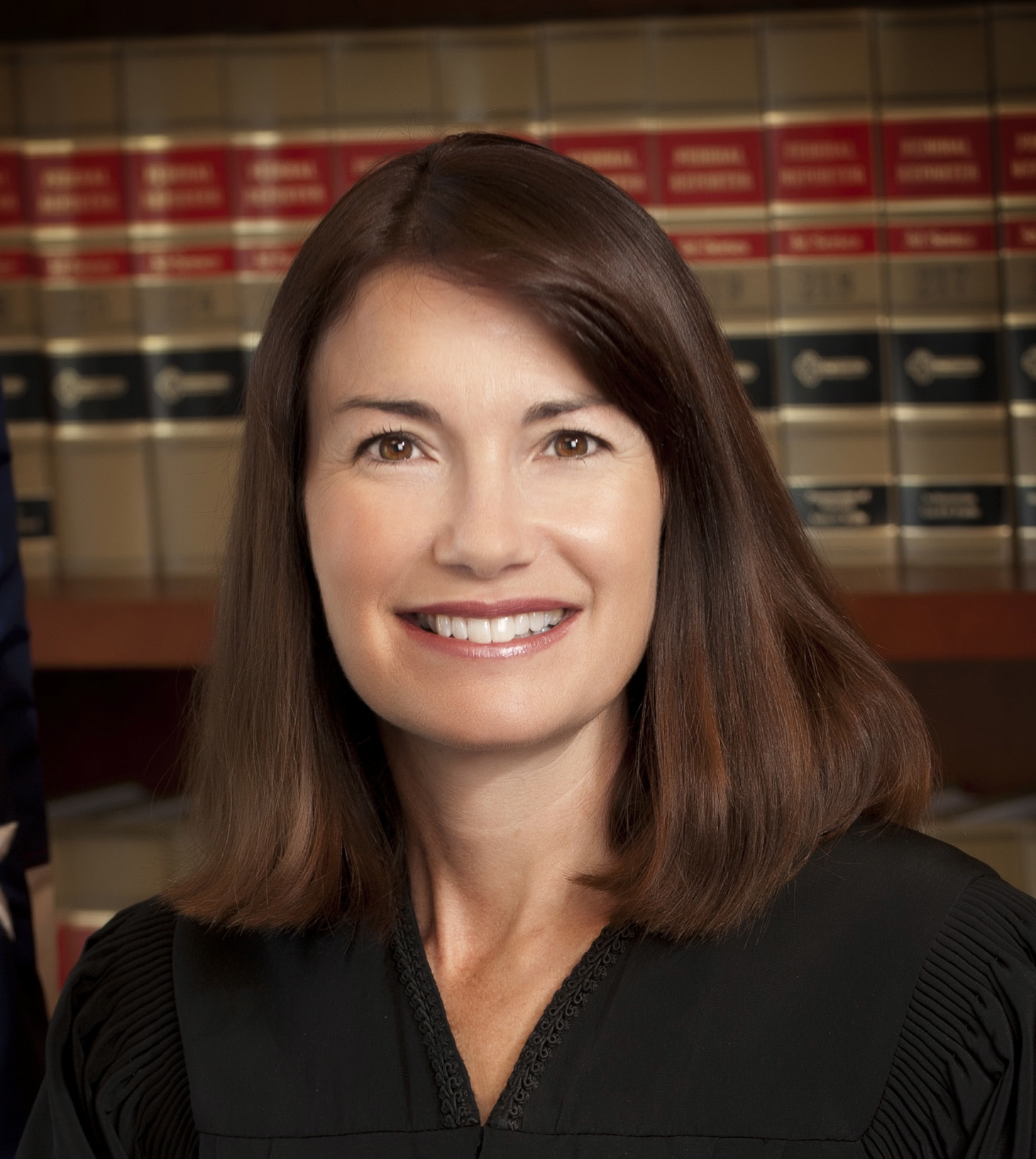

Senior Judge of the United States District Court for the Central District of California
- Incumbent
- Assumed office September 19, 2026

Judge of the United States District Court for the Central District of California
- In office June 22, 2010 – September 19, 2026
- Appointed by: Barack Obama
- Preceded by: Alicemarie Huber Stotler
- Succeeded by: vacant

Judge of the Orange County Superior Court
- In office 2002–2010
- Appointed by: Gray Davis
- Preceded by: Richard Fybel

Personal details
- Born: 1961 (age 64–65) St. Louis, Missouri, U.S.
- Education: William Jewell College (BA); Harvard University (JD)

Josephine Laura Staton (born 1961) is a senior United States district judge of the United States District Court for the Central District of California.

== Early life and education ==
Born in St. Louis, Missouri, Staton graduated from Lindbergh High School, earned a Bachelor of Arts degree in 1983 from William Jewell College and obtained a Juris Doctor in 1986 from Harvard Law School. From 1986 until 1987, Staton was a law clerk for Judge John R. Gibson on the United States Court of Appeals for the Eighth Circuit.

== Career ==
From 1987 until 2002, Staton was an attorney with the San Francisco and Newport Beach offices of the law firm Morrison & Foerster, first as an associate (1987–1994) and then as a partner (1995–2002). In 2002, Staton became a judge on Orange County Superior Court, based in Santa Ana. She was appointed to the position by Governor Gray Davis to fill the vacancy created when Judge Richard D. Fybel was elevated to the California Court of Appeal in Orange County.

=== Federal judicial service ===
On February 4, 2010, President Barack Obama nominated Staton to fill the vacancy in the Central District created by Judge Alicemarie Huber Stotler, who assumed senior status in January 2009. On March 18, 2010, the United States Senate Committee on the Judiciary reported Staton's nomination to the full Senate, which unanimously confirmed Staton on June 21, 2010, in a voice vote. She received her commission on June 22, 2010. Staton was appointed to the bench under the name of Josephine Staton Tucker and served under that name until September 20, 2013. She assumed senior status on September 19, 2026.

== Notable cases ==
=== Friedrichs v. California Teachers Association ===
Staton presided over a challenge brought by several Orange County public school teachers to the California Teachers Union's exclusive bargaining system on constitutional grounds. The 9th Circuit Court of Appeals affirmed her ruling in favor of the teachers union, and this ruling was upheld by an evenly divided U.S. Supreme Court in a 4-4 per curiam decision in Friedrichs v. California Teachers Ass'n. Justice Scalia had been the expected 5th vote to overturn the controlling 1977 Abood decision, but his 2016 death shortly after the case was argued meant there was a deadlocked decision. Subsequently, Abood was overturned in Janus v. AFSCME in 2018, which effectively overturned Staton's ruling in Friedrichs.

=== Afghan family travel ban case ===
In the wake of President Donald Trump's controversial Executive Order 13769 restricting immigration from seven Muslim-majority countries, certain individuals with valid U.S. visas continued to be detained at borders and airports despite a nationwide temporary restraining order having been issued by U.S. District Judge James Robart in Washington v. Trump. In a case that drew international attention, Staton issued an emergency temporary restraining order on March 4, 2017, to prevent an Afghan family from being separated—and the wife and three small children sent to a detention facility in Texas—after all five had arrived at Los Angeles International Airport with Special Immigrant Visas and were detained for almost two days without access to counsel. Staton held a hearing on March 6, 2017, after which the Department of Homeland Security released the family for provisional resettlement in Washington state and ultimately granted them permanent residency status. Special immigrant visas were created for citizens from Iraq and Afghanistan whose lives were at risk because they had worked for the U.S. military or government, and the visa requires intense State Department vetting and interviews before being approved. At the hearing it was revealed that the visas had been issued because the father had worked for the U.S. military in Afghanistan for more than 10 years and had received death threats from the Taliban.

=== Constitutionality of CFPB ===
In a case involving a long-running investigation by the Consumer Financial Protection Bureau (CFPB) into the fraudulent consumer debt relief practices of Morgan Drexen and its proxy law firm, Staton ruled that the CFPB was a constitutionally formed federal bureau. The defendant had argued that the CFPB violated constitutional separation of powers because it was headed by a single Director who exercises substantial executive power but can only be removed by the President for cause. Staton cited the Supreme Court decision in Morrison v. Olson to hold that the for-cause removal restriction protecting the CFPB's Director does not "impede the President’s ability to perform his constitutional duty" to ensure that the laws are faithfully executed. Prior to the ruling, a three judge panel of the DC Circuit Court of Appeals had found the CFPB's structure unconstitutional in a ruling written by then-Judge Brett Kavanaugh, but an en banc decision by the DC Circuit reversed that decision and found the CFPB to be constitutional. Staton's ruling was unanimously affirmed by the Ninth Circuit. The case, Seila Law v. Consumer Financial Protection Bureau, was argued before the U. S. Supreme Court on March 3, 2020. On June 29, 2020, the Supreme Court in a 5–4 decision ruled that the CFPB structure, with a sole director that could only be terminated for cause, was unconstitutional as it violated the separation of powers, vacating the lower court judgement and remanding the case for review. The Court found that the statute concerning the director of the CFPB was severable from the rest of the statute establishing the agency, and thus "The agency may therefore continue to operate, but its Director, in light of our decision, must be removable by the President at will."

=== Kids' climate change case ===
On January 17, 2020, on a 2–1 vote, a Ninth Circuit panel reversed an Oregon district court ruling in Juliana, et al. v. United States of America, et al., a climate justice-based lawsuit filed in 2015 by 21 youth plaintiffs including Xiuhtezcatl Martinez against the United States and several of its executive branch positions and officers, formerly including President Barack Obama and currently, President Donald Trump. The plaintiffs, on behalf of themselves and future generations, sought relief under the U.S. Constitution for longstanding U.S. governmental policy contributing to global climate disruption and caused by man-made greenhouse gas emissions. The majority agreed that the government had not rebutted the plaintiffs' science-based allegations of a looming climate catastrophe, but found a lack of standing on the part of the plaintiffs, with Judge Andrew D. Hurwitz holding that "it is beyond the power of an Article III court to order, design, supervise, or implement the plaintiffs' requested remedial plan. As the opinions of their experts make plain, any effective plan would necessarily require a host of complex policy decisions entrusted, for better or worse, to the wisdom and discretion of the executive and legislative branches."

In dissent, Staton, sitting on the 9th Circuit panel by designation, characterized the majority as shirking its judicial responsibility to rectify a grave constitutional wrong in the manner the U.S. Supreme Court laudably did in its landmark Brown v. Board of Education decision, stating, "My colleagues throw up their hands, concluding that this case presents nothing fit for the Judiciary." She further argued, "No case can singlehandedly prevent the catastrophic effects of climate change predicted by the government and scientists. But a federal court need not manage all of the delicate foreign relations and regulatory minutiae implicated by climate change to offer real relief, and the mere fact that this suit cannot alone halt climate change does not mean that it presents no claim suitable for judicial resolution." In an analogy from her impassioned dissent that became widely cited in the news media, Staton stated that "[i]n these proceedings, the government accepts as fact that the United States has reached a tipping point crying out for a concerted response -- yet presses ahead toward calamity. It is as if an asteroid were barreling toward Earth and the government decided to shut down our only defenses. Seeking to quash this suit, the government bluntly insists that it has the absolute and unreviewable power to destroy the Nation." The plaintiffs in Juliana subsequently requested a full en banc review by the 9th Circuit of the panel's decision. The petition was denied.

=== Coronavirus quarantine case ===
In a case that drew national media attention, Staton issued a temporary restraining order at the request of the City of Costa Mesa on February 21, 2020, in response to a hasty plan by the State of California and the U.S. federal government to ship dozens of patients testing positive for coronavirus, then quarantined at Travis Air Force Base in Solano County, to a former assisted living center in Orange County, California. Staton scheduled an expedited hearing for the following Monday, after which she continued the TRO in place pending a showing by the State of California as to its plan to house the patients in a densely populated part of the county. Prior to the hearing, the federal government had planned to ship the non-California resident former passengers of the Diamond Princess cruise ship from Travis to a former army base in Anniston, Alabama, but Governor Kay Ivey of Alabama lobbied President Trump to include them in the group to be sent to Orange County, California, instead. At the hearing it became apparent that neither the State of California nor the Federal Government had developed a rationale for the plan, so the TRO was continued for another week to allow the authorities to do so. Prior to the next scheduled hearing, as the COVID-19 pandemic evolved, the state and federal governments withdrew their plan to house the Travis patients at the Fairview Developmental Center location.

Legal offices
Preceded by Alicemarie Huber Stotler	Judge of the United States District Court for the Central District of California; 2010–2026	Vacant
