= Genesis B. v. EPA =

United States court case

Genesis B. v. EPA is a court case filed in the state of California against the United States Environmental Protection Agency (EPA).

The suit alleges that the EPA "intentionally allows" planet-warming gases to come from sources that it regulates.

The lawsuit was filed by Our Children's Trust, the law firm that brought Held v. Montana.

In May 2024, the lawsuit was dismissed.
