= Juliana v. United States =

2015 lawsuit

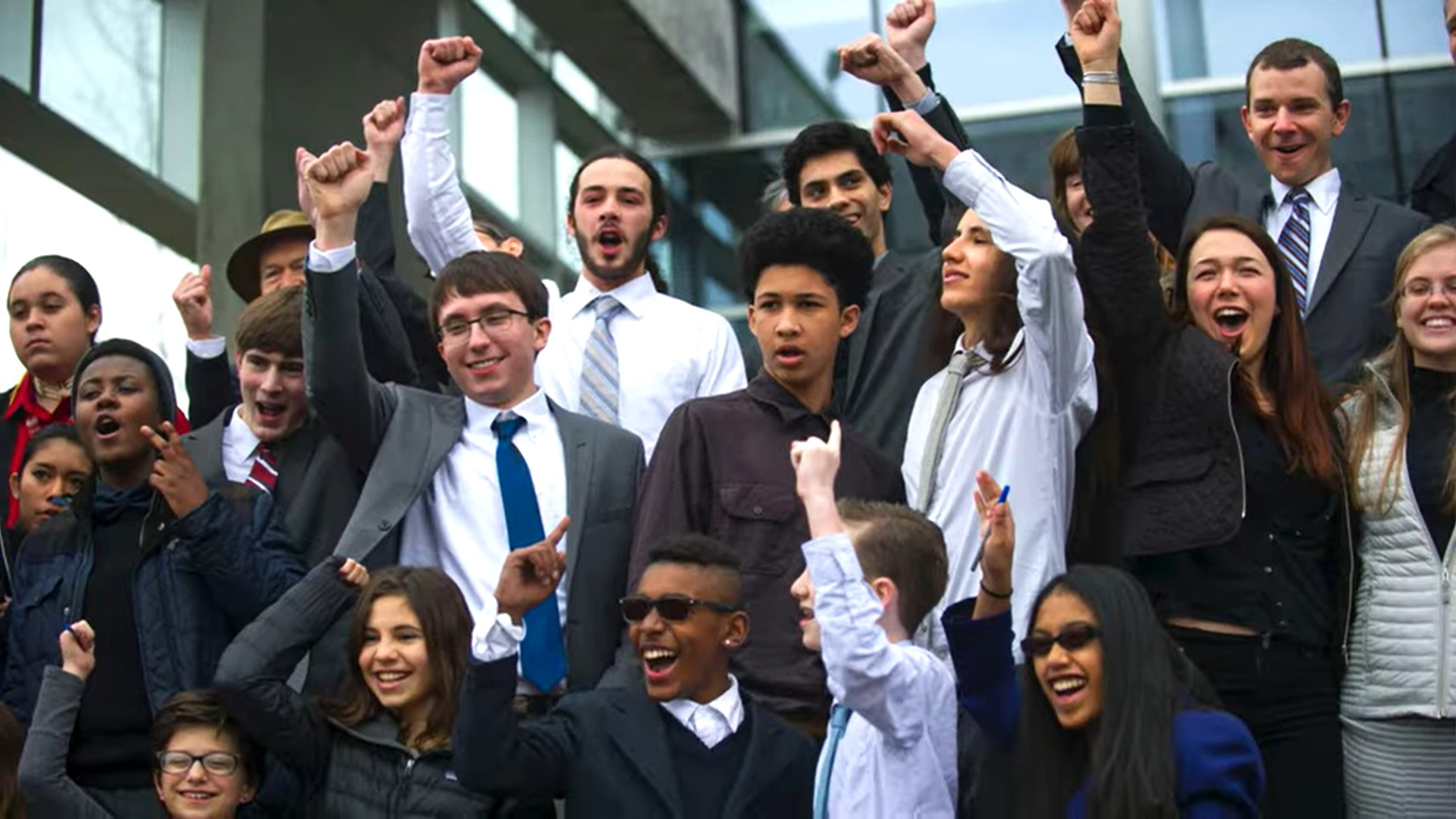
Plaintiffs in Juliana v. United States. Kelsey Juliana is second from the right in the second row.

Juliana, et al. v. United States of America, et al. was a climate-related lawsuit filed in 2015 and dismissed in 2020. Filed by 21 youth plaintiffs against the United States and several executive branch officials. Filing their case in the United States District Court for the District of Oregon, the plaintiffs, represented by the non-profit organization Our Children's Trust, include Xiuhtezcatl Martinez, the members of Martinez's organization Earth Guardians, and climatologist James Hansen as a "guardian for future generations". Some fossil fuel and industry groups initially intervened as defendants but later requested to be dropped following the 2016 presidential election, stating that the case would be well defended under the new administration.

The plaintiffs asserted that the government had knowingly violated their due process rights of life, liberty, and property, as well as the government's sovereign duty to protect public grounds, by encouraging and permitting the combustion of fossil fuels. They called for the government to offer “both declaratory and injunctive relief for their claim—specifically, a declaration of the federal government's fiduciary role in preserving the atmosphere and an injunction of its actions which contravene that role.” The case is an example of an area of environmental law referred to as "atmospheric trust litigation", a concept based on the public trust doctrine and international responsibility related to natural resources.

The Ninth Circuit dismissed the suit in January 2020 for lack of standing, upheld en banc in February 2021. The plaintiffs filed an amended complaint in an attempt to address standing. The amended suit was dismissed by the Ninth Circuit in May 2024, again over lack of standing. The Supreme Court of the United States declined to hear the case by March 2025.

== Case history ==
=== Background ===
Climate change litigation has been attempted since the 1990s. The Oregon non-profit organization, Our Children's Trust, was created by attorney Julia Olson to help formulate legal cases that could be taken against states and the federal government that would charge them with mitigating climate change under the public trust doctrine. Olson established the non-profit with advice and assistance from Mary Christina Wood, director of the Environmental and Natural Resources Law Program at the University of Oregon, who had been studying the concept of the public trust doctrine and established the idea of "Atmospheric Trust Litigation" to take legal action to make governments responsible for actions related to climate change. Part of Our Children's Trust's inspiration was from Oposa's work in the Philippines. Since 2011, Our Children's Trust has been filing various state and federal lawsuits on behalf of youth, though most of these have been dismissed by courts, as courts generally have not ruled that access to a clean environment is a right that can be litigated against. Such cases are also generally dismissed as lawsuits cannot be initiated by "generalized grievances", and require plaintiffs with standing to sue and can demonstrate concrete harm that the government has done, and that the courts can at least partially redress the harm by order of the court. Further, cases cannot be brought to court if they deal with a "political question" which can only be resolved by actions of Congress and the President.

A few related cases on climate change have made it to the Supreme Court. The first, which opened the way for the others, was Massachusetts v. Environmental Protection Agency, 549 U.S. 497 (2007). In that suit, twelve states sued the Environmental Protection Agency (EPA) for failing to regulate emissions of greenhouse gases and sought relief. The Court agreed with the states by a 5–4 vote on each of three issues: that the states had standing to sue the EPA for not issuing regulations, that greenhouse gases were air pollutants, and that the EPA was authorized to regulate them. The majority opinion stated that, while any regulation made by the EPA would be unlikely to stop global warming, the agency should be required to regulate such emissions to reduce the extent of global warming. Further, Massachusetts v. EPA modified standing precedent by ruling that only one plaintiff had to demonstrate a particularized harm. Subsequent cases were less successful. For example, an attempt to sue public utilities for greenhouse gas emissions under a "public nuisance" theory invoking the federal common law of nuisance was unanimously rejected by the Court in 2011 in American Electric Power Co. v. Connecticut, 564 U.S. 410 (2011). Also, a challenge to the EPA's subsequent regulations on greenhouse gases was upheld in part and denied in part in Utility Air Regulatory Group v. EPA, 573 U.S. ___ (2014), a ruling which rejected the EPA's expansive reading of its powers by a 5–4 vote but permitted EPA to implement greenhouse gas regulation on existing monitored power plants by a 7–2 vote.

=== Initial hearings ===
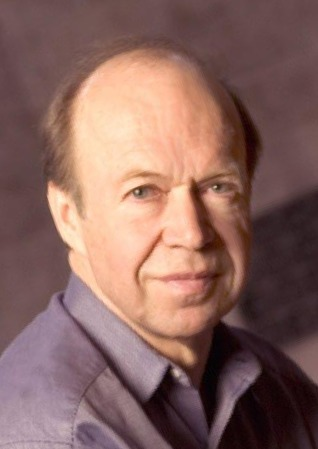
Climatologist James Hansen, who was representing the youth as a "guardian for future generations"

The present case was filed in August 2015 with the United States District Court for the District of Oregon, and was assigned to judge Ann Aiken, who was then the chief judge of the court. The 21 youths, ranging from 8 to 19 at the time of filing, received pro bono representation from Our Children's Trust, and had support of climatologist James Hansen, acting as a "guardian for future generations" in the case filings. (Hansen's granddaughter Sophie Kivlehan was one of the named plaintiffs.) The youths were selected by Our Children's Trust as they thought they were able to demonstrate immediate "concrete injury" due to climate change, such as having their homes wiped out by excessive flooding, rising sea levels, and desertification which were tied to climate change.

The case was filed against President Barack Obama and several agencies within the executive branch, and sought confirmation that their constitutional and public trust rights had been violated by the government's actions, and sought an order to enjoin the defendants from continued violation of their rights and to develop a plan to mitigate carbon dioxide emissions. Among their arguments, the youths' attorneys asserted that the lack of governmental action on climate change discriminated against the youths' generation, since they would be most impacted by climate change but have no voting rights to influence that.

Three fossil fuel industry groups, the American Petroleum Institute, American Fuel and Petrochemical Manufacturers, and the National Association of Manufacturers, initially intervened in the case as defendants, joining the U.S. government in trying to have the case dismissed. Pre-trial hearings were held in March 2016 before U.S. Magistrate Judge Thomas Coffin. The U.S. Department of Justice argued that there was "no constitutional right to a pollution-free environment", and that the court system was not the proper venue to effect such changes. Coffin ruled in April 2016 recommending that both motions to dismiss were denied; Coffin found that while the case was "unprecedented", it had sufficient merit to continue. Coffin's decision was upheld by Judge Aiken, who ruled in November 2016 that the right to "a climate system capable of sustaining human life" was a fundamental right similar to gay marriage as decided by the recent Supreme Court case, Obergefell v Hodges. According to Michael Gerrard, the director of the Sabin Center for Climate Change Law at Columbia University, "this decision goes further than any other court ever has in declaring a fundamental obligation of government to prevent dangerous climate change", and Judge Aiken's decision that there might be a constitutional right to a sound environment was the first such ruling ever from a federal court. Preliminary trial dates were set for 2017.

Following the 2016 election, the federal defendants filed a response to the plaintiff's complaint on January 13, 2017, one week before President Obama left office. In their response, the federal defendants denied that they had caused climate change or specific climate change impacts such as increased temperatures, drought conditions, warmer water temperatures, rising sea levels, and ocean acidification. About a month later, the complaint was amended to make the lead defendant newly elected President Donald Trump. In the months that followed, the fossil fuel industry groups requested that they be removed from the case, believing that the Department of Justice under the Trump Administration would vigorously defend the case, unlike the Obama Administration. The National Association of Manufacturers, one of the fossil fuel groups, said that "as the dynamics have changed over the last several months, we no longer feel that our participation in this case is needed to safeguard industry and our workers". In late June 2017, Judge Coffin released the fossil fuel industry defendants from the case, as well as establishing a trial date on February 5, 2018, before Judge Aiken.

=== Government objections ===
In early June 2017, the Department of Justice filed a motion requesting that Judge Aiken rule on its prior motion for an interlocutory appeal to the Ninth Circuit of Judge Aiken's November 2016 decision on the justiciability of the plaintiffs' claims, by June 9 or the department would directly seek a writ of mandamus regarding the issue in the Ninth Circuit. Judge Aiken denied the motion requesting the interlocutory appeal on June 8, leading the government to petition the Ninth Circuit for a writ of mandamus on June 11. The government's petition argued that the Ninth Circuit needed to act to correct "multiple and clear errors of law in refusing to dismiss an action that seeks wholesale changes in federal government policy based on utterly unprecedented legal theories". The government also argued that the pre-trial discovery phase would cause the government harm due to the volume of data and evidence they would need to provide.

After receiving responses from the plaintiffs, the Ninth Circuit opted in November 2017 to hear oral arguments before making their decision. These arguments were held on December 11, 2017, in front of Judges Sidney Thomas, Alex Kozinski, and Marsha Berzon. A few days later, Judge Kozinski stepped down from the Ninth Circuit. On December 21, 2017, Judge Michelle Friedland was appointed to replace Kozinski. Due to the Ninth Circuit's hearing, the planned trial date at District Court was put on hold. On March 7, 2018, the Ninth Circuit Court of Appeals unanimously rejected the requested writ of mandamus in a decision by Judge Thomas. The District Court trial was then rescheduled to start October 29, 2018.

The government then petitioned the Supreme Court of the United States requesting a stay to delay the trial. On July 30, 2018, the Supreme Court issued a brief order, denying the government's request for a stay as premature but expressing skepticism about the lawsuit, as well as noting that the breadth of the plaintiffs' claims was "striking" and requesting that the District Court issue a prompt ruling on the government's motions challenging the overall justiciability of those claims.

Following the Supreme Court's order, the government again presented two motions to dismiss the case to Judge Aiken in July 2018. One motion stated that the case, in addressing multiple government agencies, violated the Administrative Procedure Act, while the other motion challenged the youths' standing in the case. While Judge Aiken said she would rule promptly on the motions, she had not issued her decision by October 5, causing the government again to request an emergency stay from the Ninth Circuit via a second writ of mandamus, asking them to delay the case until Aiken ruled on the two motions. On October 15, Judge Aiken ruled on the two motions, denying both. Aiken also removed President Trump as a defendant in the case without prejudice, meaning that he could be re-added to the case at a later stage, and reaffirmed the trial start date of October 29.

In response, on October 18, 2018, the U.S. government submitted an emergency motion to the Supreme Court, again requesting to stay the trial. The government claimed that, "Absent relief from this court, the government imminently will be forced to participate in a 50-day trial that would violate bedrock requirements for agency decision making and judicial review imposed by the [Administrative Procedure Act] and the separation of powers." Chief Justice John Roberts of the Supreme Court granted the stay the next day, pending receipt of a response to the government's brief from the plaintiffs. An environmental law professor at UCLA opined, with regard to this stay, "It's certainly a signal that the court is uncomfortable with the underlying legal theory of the Juliana case." On October 24, 2018, Judge Aiken filed an order vacating the trial start date of October 29 and placing a hold on the rest of the trial schedule.

On November 2, the Supreme Court (by a 7–2 vote) denied the government's request for a writ of mandamus and vacated the stay, holding that the government could still be granted pretrial relief from the Ninth Circuit. In its order, the court noted that, even though the Ninth Circuit had already denied the government's request for relief twice, the reasons supporting its denials on the prior occasions "are, to a large extent, no longer pertinent". The order was issued without prejudice, leaving open the possibility that the case could return to the Supreme Court again prior to trial, depending upon the actions taken by the Ninth Circuit.

=== Interlocutory appeal ===
On November 8, 2018, consistent with the Supreme Court's order of November 2, 2018, the Ninth Circuit granted an indefinite stay on the trial pending its ruling on the government's request for a writ of mandamus, as well as requesting briefs from both the plaintiffs and the trial court on the writ and requiring the trial court to rule on the government's renewed motion for an interlocutory appeal. On November 21, 2018, Judge Aiken reversed her position and granted the government's request for an interlocutory appeal, putting the entire case on hold until the higher courts have ruled on this appeal.

Judge Aiken issued an order certifying the case for interlocutory appeal to the Ninth Circuit Court of Appeals and staying the case pending this decision. She declared that she did not “make this decision lightly,” emphasizing that, while she stood by her prior rulings recommending that the case should go to trial, she believed the case was better suited for appeal after trial, not before.

On permission granted, the government filed a petition with the Ninth Circuit on November 30, 2018, for interlocutory review of the order on motions to dismiss and the order on motions for judgment on the pleadings and summary judgment. An answer was filed with the Court by the plaintiffs on December 10, 2018.

On December 26, 2018, the Ninth Circuit denied the requested writ of mandamus as moot but granted the interlocutory appeal by a 2–1 vote. Subsequently, as requested by plaintiffs, the Ninth Circuit set an expedited schedule for the appeal, requiring the government's opening appeal brief by February 1, 2019, the plaintiff's response brief by February 22, 2019, and all briefing to be completed by March 8, 2019. The government's appeal brief again challenged the unique constitutional and statutory rulings on standing, fundamental rights, and the public trust doctrine made by the district court. On February 7, 2019, the plaintiffs filed an "extraordinary motion" asking the Ninth Circuit to issue a preliminary injunction by March 19, 2019, blocking the federal government from approving any fossil fuel production activities either on federal land or needing federal approval, such as coal mining on federal land, oil or natural gas drilling offshore, or pipelines that need federal approval. In opposition, the federal government noted that the case was filed over 3.5 years before the plaintiff's initial request for an emergency injunction. Meanwhile, the plaintiffs argued in part that the appeal was improvidently granted and that the case should be returned to Judge Aiken. The Ninth Circuit scheduled oral argument on the appeal for the week of June 3, 2019 in Portland, and the appeal was ultimately heard on June 4 in front of a different three-judge panel from the Ninth Circuit consisting of Mary H. Murguia, Andrew D. Hurwitz, and Josephine Staton (sitting by designation), all of whom were appointed to the bench by President Obama.

Some legal experts believed that the interlocutory appeal "could (and, indeed, likely will) bring this litigation to an end" due to the Supreme Court's already-expressed skepticism. Other experts, such as the director of Columbia University's climate change center, noted that any decision in favor of the plaintiffs likely would be reversed by the Supreme Court, which has been reluctant to declare new rights and which unanimously held in American Electric Power Co. v. Connecticut that it was not for the courts to decide appropriate levels of pollution.

On January 17, 2020, on a 2–1 vote, the Ninth Circuit panel dismissed the case for lack of Article III standing. Writing for the majority, Judge Hurwitz wrote that "it is beyond the power of an Article III court to order, design, supervise, or implement the plaintiffs' requested remedial plan. As the opinions of their experts make plain, any effective plan would necessarily require a host of complex policy decisions entrusted, for better or worse, to the wisdom and discretion of the executive and legislative branches." In dissent, Judge Staton characterized the majority as shirking its judicial responsibility to rectify a grave constitutional wrong in the manner the U.S. Supreme Court laudably did in its landmark Brown v. Board of Education decision, stating, "My colleagues throw up their hands, concluding that this case presents nothing fit for the Judiciary." She further argued, "No case can singlehandedly prevent the catastrophic effects of climate change predicted by the government and scientists. But a federal court need not manage all of the delicate foreign relations and regulatory minutiae implicated by climate change to offer real relief, and the mere fact that this suit cannot alone halt climate change does not mean that it presents no claim suitable for judicial resolution."

Lawyers for the plaintiffs stated their intent to appeal this dismissal to the full Ninth Circuit sitting en banc, and subsequently filed such a petition. Experts in the fields of constitutional law, climate change, and public health, and several leading women's, children's, environmental, and human rights organizations filing ten amicus curiae (friend of the court) briefs with the Ninth Circuit Court of Appeals in support of the plaintiffs, urging the Ninth Circuit Court of Appeals to grant the en banc petition. On February 10, 2021, the en banc Ninth Circuit issued an order without written dissents denying this appeal, although the plaintiffs discussed filing a further appeal to the Supreme Court. During the gap before that possible appeal, and despite the Ninth Circuit's order to dismiss the case, Judge Aiken ordered the parties to meet with Magistrate Judge Coffin to discuss a possible settlement, which the government agreed to do.

=== Amended complaint ===
In July 2021, the plaintiffs moved for leave to amend their complaint. Ongoing settlement talks broke down in November 2021. On June 1, 2023, Judge Aiken granted the plaintiffs' motion for leave to amend the complaint, clearing the way for the case to go to trial. The plaintiffs had previously sought injunctive relief pushing for a change in federal policy. The amended complaint seeks a declaratory judgment that the nation's fossil-fuel-based energy system is unconstitutional.

On Dec. 29, 2023, Judge Aiken ruled that her court would hear the case as based on the amended complaint. The three-judge Ninth Circuit panel ruled on May 1, 2024, that the plaintiffs lacked standing and ordered the lower court to dismiss the case with no option to amend their filings. On Sep 12, 2024, the plaintiffs asked the Supreme Court to overturn the Ninth Circuit's dismissal of the case. The Supreme Court declined to hear the appeal in March 2025.

== Involved parties ==
=== Plaintiffs ===
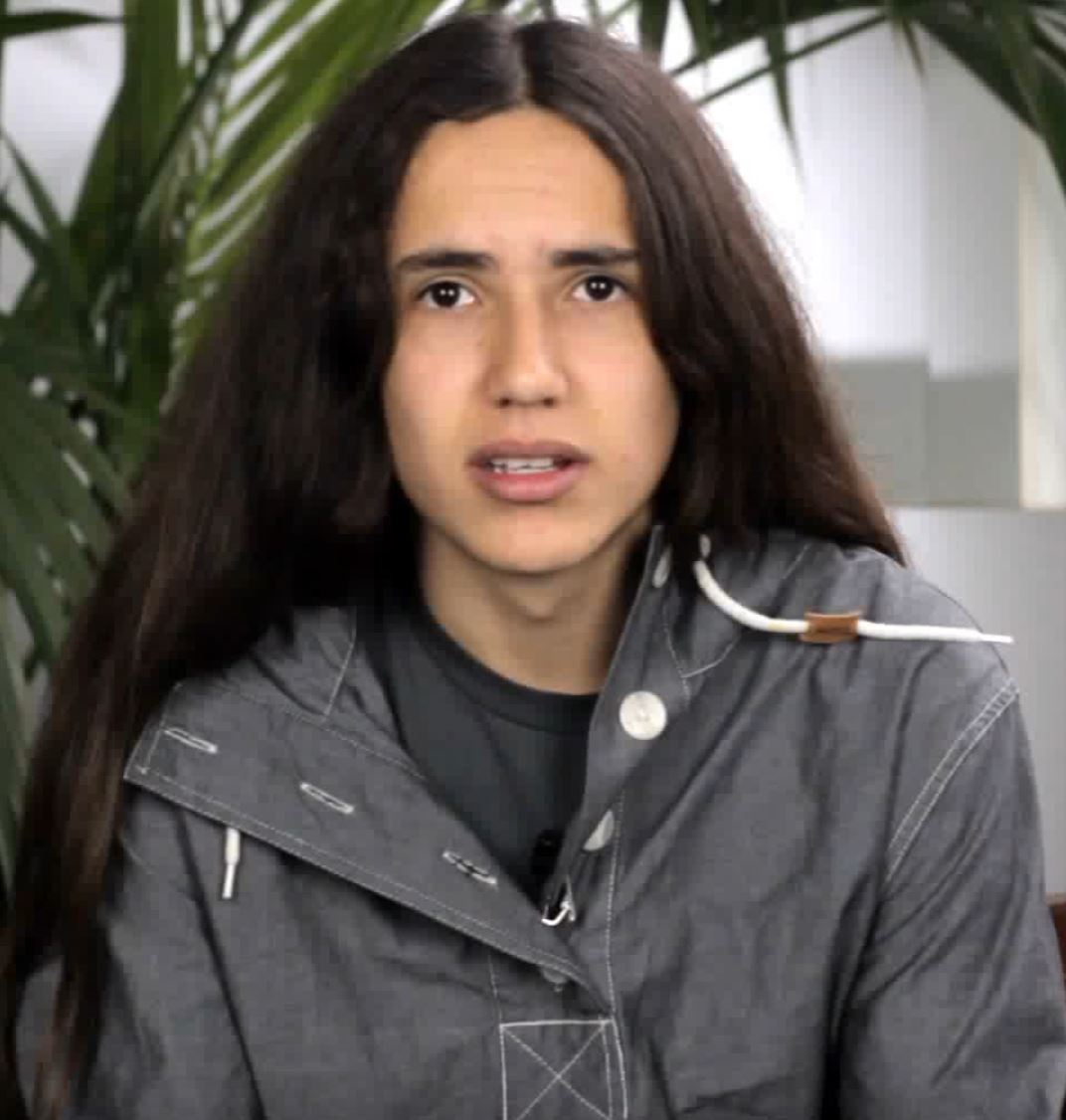
One of the plaintiffs, Xiuhtezcatl Martinez

The plaintiffs in the case are:

- Kelsey Cascadia Rose Juliana
- Xiuhtezcatl Martinez (through his guardian when he was a minor)
- Jacob Lebel
- Zealand Bell (through his guardian)
- Avery McRae (through her guardian)
- Sahara Valentine (through her guardian)
- Tia Hatton
- Isaac Vergun (through his guardian)
- Miko Vergun (through her guardian)
- Hazel Van Ummersen (through her guardian)
- Jamie Lynn Butler (through her guardian)
- Journey Zephier (through his guardian)
- Vic Barrett
- Nathan Baring
- Aji Piper (through his guardian)
- Levi Draheim (through his guardian)
- Jayden Foytlin (through her guardian)
- Nic Venner (through their guardian)
- Kiran Oommen
- Alex Loznak
- Sophie Kivlehan
- The organization Earth Guardians
- Future generations, represented by James Hansen

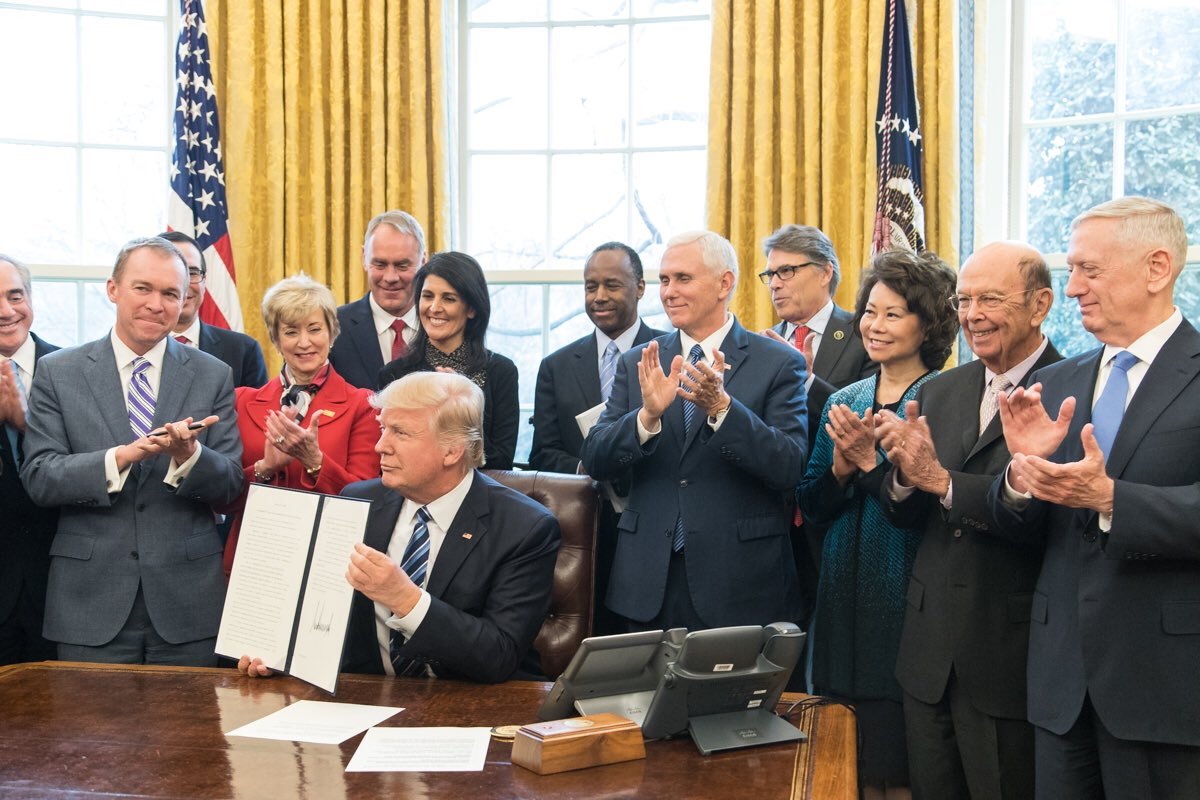
The Cabinet of the United States, pictured in March 2017. Several members (or their successors) are defendants.

=== Defendants ===
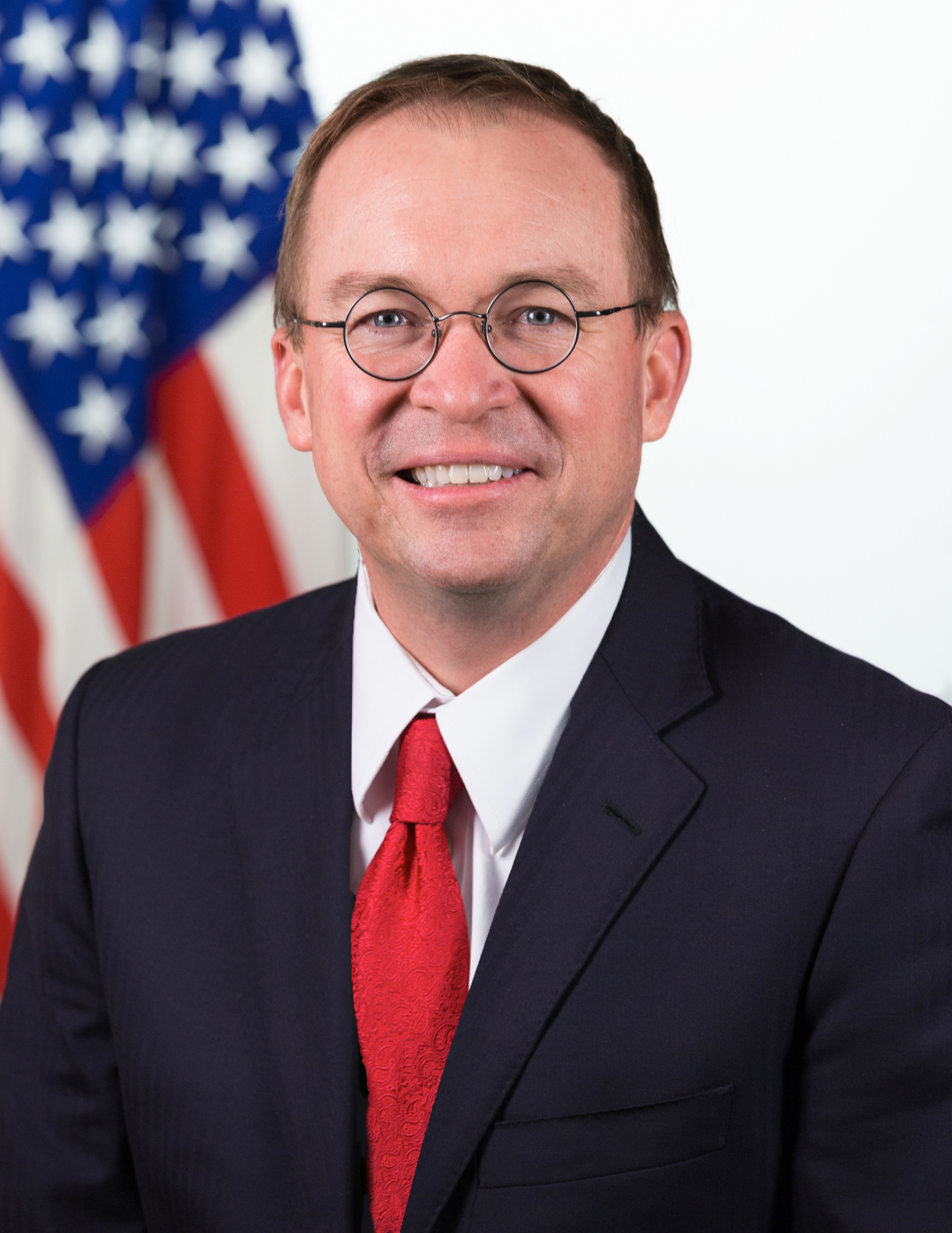
Mick Mulvaney, Director of the Office of Management and Budget

- The United States of America
- Chair of the Council on Environmental Quality
- Mick Mulvaney, Director of the Office of Management and Budget
- Chair of the Office of Science and Technology Policy
- United States Department of Energy
  - Rick Perry, United States Secretary of Energy
- United States Department of the Interior
  - Ryan Zinke, United States Secretary of the Interior
- United States Department of Transportation
  - Elaine Chao, United States Secretary of Transportation
- United States Department of Agriculture
  - Sonny Perdue, United States Secretary of Agriculture
- United States Department of Commerce
  - Wilbur Ross, United States Secretary of Commerce
- United States Department of Defense
  - Jim Mattis, United States Secretary of Defense
- United States Department of State
  - Mike Pompeo, United States Secretary of State
- United States Environmental Protection Agency
  - Scott Pruitt, Administrator of the Environmental Protection Agency

== Influence ==
The Juliana lawsuit has been the focus of two segments on the American television news program 60 Minutes. The case's plaintiffs were featured on the show on March 3, 2019, and an update that included a broad overview of the case aired on June 23, 2019.

In a case modeled on Juliana, the Philadelphia-based Clean Air Council filed a lawsuit in 2017 on behalf of two minors as the plaintiffs against the federal government's efforts to roll back the Clean Power Plan in the United States District Court for the Eastern District of Pennsylvania. The case was assigned to Judge Paul S. Diamond, who dismissed it for the plaintiffs' lack of standing on February 19, 2019. In so holding, Judge Diamond noted that Judge Aiken's rulings in the Juliana case "certainly contravened or ignored longstanding authority", and stated that the requested rulings would "make the Executive a subsidiary of the Judiciary".

Similarly, a 2012 lawsuit brought by six Alaskan youths against the state of Alaska that took the public trust doctrine approach (that the state has an affirmative duty to protect public trust assets from harm) was rejected by the Alaska Supreme Court in 2014 on the grounds that this issue was too general and one for the political branches to decide, not the judiciary. In a revised attempt, a 2017 lawsuit (Sinnok v. Alaska) involving 16 Alaskan youths (and coordinated by the same group, Our Children's Trust) was filed against the state of Alaska seeking to declare unconstitutional Alaskan laws promoting fossil fuel development. This lawsuit was also dismissed in 2018 by a trial judge, who wrote, "[The youths'] general claims allege that the state has permitted oil and gas drilling, coal mining, and fossil fuel use, but [the youths] do not allege how this is evidence of the state breaching any legal duty." This dismissal was appealed to the Alaska Supreme Court, which affirmed the dismissal in 2022.

On September 23, 2019, Greta Thunberg, who had inspired the school strikes for climate movement, and 15 other children filed a legal complaint under the optional "Human Rights" protocol to the United Nations' Convention on the Rights of the Child against the five signatory nations with the most carbon emissions: Argentina, Brazil, France, Germany, and Turkey (who combined account for just over 6.1% of global emissions). The complaint argues that these children's rights and those of future children are being violated by the countries' unregulated emissions and would force these countries to enter into agreements with other nations to set binding emission limits (although the countries could instead withdraw from the protocol). Thunberg has previously joined the plaintiffs in Juliana in various speaking appearances before lawmakers in the United States and elsewhere.

Nationwide gatherings in solidarity with the case took place in 2018, originally intending to coincide with the start of the trial.

In October 2019, a group of 15 youths filed a lawsuit against the government of Canada, claiming that the government's lack of climate change action was a violation of their rights to life, liberty and equality. The lawsuit was dismissed in November 2020.

The lawsuit was the subject of a documentary, entitled Youth v Gov, that started streaming on Netflix in April 2022.

A court case in the mold of Juliana, Held v. Montana alleges harm under Montana's state constitution. In 2023 a District Court ruled that the Montana Environmental Policy Act (MEPA) that prohibited the state from considering greenhouse gas emissions was a violation of the "Plaintiffs' right to a clean and healthful environment and is facially unconstitutional". The Office of the Attorney General of Montana will appeal the decision. Montana's Supreme Court heard oral arguments on July 10, 2024.

== See also ==
- Climate justice
- Held v. Montana
- Regulation of greenhouse gases under the Clean Air Act
