= Held v. Montana =

2023 U.S. State Constitutional court case

Held v. State of Montana
- Court: First Judicial District Court, Lewis and Clark County, Helena
- Full case name: Held et al. v. State of Montana, Governor Steve Bullock, Montana Department of Environmental Quality, Montana Department of Natural Resources and Conservation, Montana Department of Transportation, and Montana Public Service Commission

Court membership
- Judge sitting: Kathy Seeley

Held v. Montana is a constitutional court case in the State of Montana regarding the right to a "clean and healthful environment in Montana for present and future generations"^{:Art. IX, § 1} as required by the Constitution of Montana. The case was filed in March 2020 by Our Children's Trust on behalf of sixteen youth residents of Montana, then aged 2 through 18. On June 12, 2023, the case became the first climate-related constitutional lawsuit to go to trial in the United States.

The plaintiffs argued that the state's support of the fossil fuel industry had worsened the effects of climate change on their lives, thus depriving them of their constitutional rights. More specifically, the plaintiffs challenged a provision in the Montana Environmental Policy Act (MEPA) that prohibited the state from considering greenhouse gas emissions as a factor when deciding whether to issue permits for energy-related projects. (Note: In 2011, the legislature amended the MEPA to prevent environmental reviews from considering "regional, national or global" environmental impacts–a provision the 2020 Held complaint called the "climate change exception". In May 2023, the month before trial, the Montana legislature amended the provision to ban the state from considering greenhouse gas emissions in reviews for new energy projects. The state's attorneys were unsuccessful in arguing that the amendment rendered the lawsuit moot, so the case went to trial in June. (Source: Noor, Dharna (June 20, 2023). "Groundbreaking youth-led climate trial comes to an end in Montana". The Guardian. Archived from the original on June 20, 2023.))

In its defense, the state claimed that regulators were simply following state law and argued that any of Montana's contributions to climate change would need to be addressed through the Montana legislature. The defense called the plaintiffs' case an "airing of political grievances" that is not actionable in court.

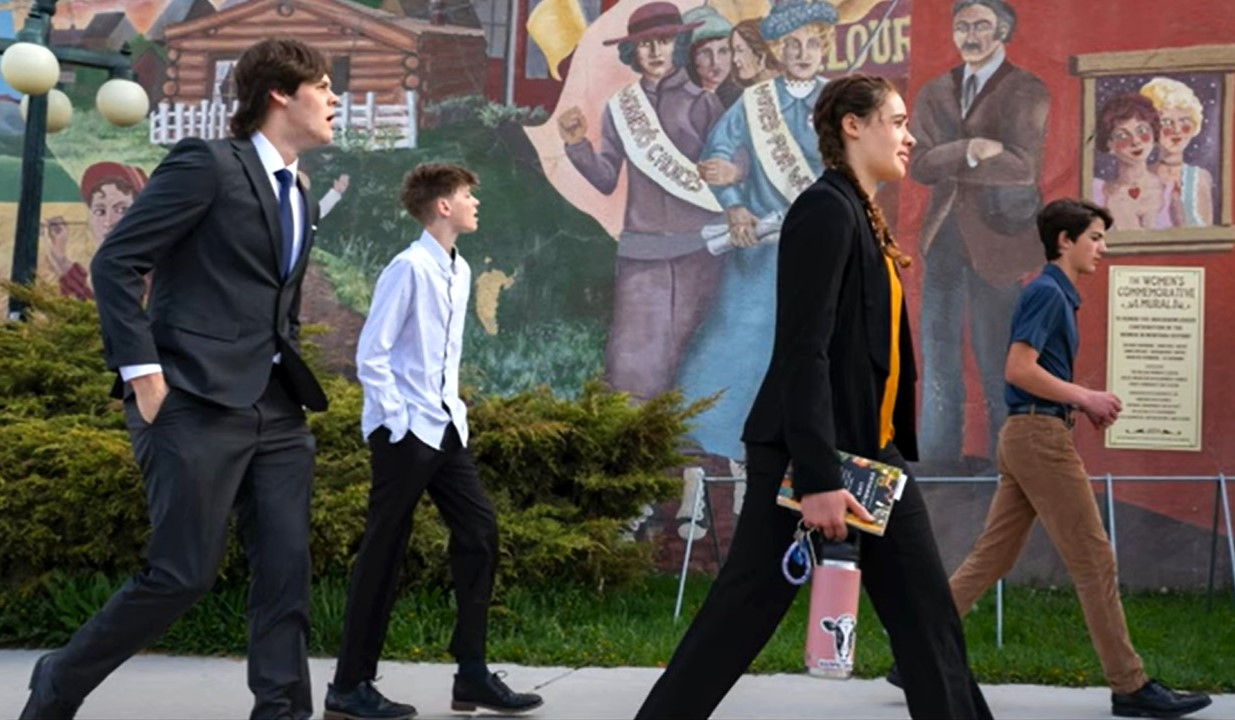
Our Children's Trust, plaintiffs in the case, proceeding to the Helena courthouse

On August 14, 2023, Lewis and Clark County District Court Judge Kathy Seeley ruled in favor of the plaintiffs that the limitations on considering environmental factors when deciding oil and gas permits violated the right to a safe environment recited in Montana’s constitution. The ruling was upheld by the Montana Supreme Court on December 18, 2024.

== History ==
Mining interests heavily influenced the content of the original (1889) Constitution of Montana, causing subsequent laws to highly favor extractive industry, with some historians even calling the state a "corporate colony". A 1972 constitutional convention added language guaranteeing citizens "the right to a clean and healthful environment"—language that would become central to the Held case. At the time of trial, Montana was one of only three states with constitutions having environmental protections explicitly recited in their bill of rights, thus avoiding a need for plaintiffs to preliminarily prove they have such rights.

Despite the 1972 amendment, according to The Guardian, policy experts say Montana officials have shaped state laws around the deeply entrenched financial interests of the fossil fuel industry. For example, in 2011 the state's energy policy was changed to prohibit the state from considering climate change as a factor when deciding whether to issue new permits. In the same year, Montana withdrew from the Western Climate Initiative, an agreement among some western American states and parts of Canada to reduce greenhouse gas emissions. In May 2023, Montana Republican lawmakers amended a limitation to the Montana Environmental Protection Act—called the "MEPA limitation"—to make it what was considered the nation’s most aggressive anti-climate action law. Separately, state laws enacted in spring 2023 explicit forbade local governments from banning fossil fuels in building codes, from banning fuel derived from petroleum, and from requiring new construction to have solar panels.

In context, in 2023 Montana was the fifth largest coal-producing U.S. state and the twelfth largest oil-producing state. Moreover, since 2003 the state received nearly $650 million from resource extraction—the eighth highest total in the country.

In 2011, nonprofit law firm Our Children's Trust asked the Montana Supreme Court to rule that the state has a duty to address climate change. The court declined the request, a decision that made the group start in a lower court. On March 13, 2020, Our Children's Trust and other law firms filed the Held v. Montana complaint in the First Judicial District Court, Lewis and Clark County, in Helena. The judge denied the state's August 2021 motion to dismiss. In 2022, the Montana attorney general requested that the state Supreme Court take control of the case, asking that discovery be stopped, but the Supreme Court denied both requests. Although over the preceding decade, youth-led climate change lawsuits had been filed in every state, only four of the suits filed by Our Children’s Trust outside of Montana case were still pending as of June 2023. On June 12, 2023, Held became the third climate-related lawsuit in the U.S. to go to trial, and the first climate-related constitutional law case in the U.S. to reach trial.

On April 14, 2023, State District Judge Michael Moses ruled that the permit for NorthWestern Energy's $250 million Laurel Generation Station on the Yellowstone River in Montana, was cancelled as the Montana Department of Environmental Quality (DEQ) had misinterpreted the state's environmental law and had failed to consider the long-term consequences of carbon dioxide emissions from the plant, which are estimated at "23 million tons" that "would impact" the town of Billings that is downwind of the Laurel Generation Station. In response to the decision by Judge Moses, on April 15, House Bill 971 was introduced, sponsored by Representative Joshua Kassmier R-Fort Benton and was quickly enacted. Bill 971 exempted the DEQ from "adhering to air quality and emissions standards when authorizing or changing permits". A Senate Bill 557 amendment sponsored by Sen. Mark Noland, R-Bigfork, which is very similar to HB 971, and was also a response to the Moses decision on the Laurel plant, was introduced on April 14.

== Legal principles ==
Global warming—the progression from cooler historical temperatures (blue) to recent warmer temperatures (red)—is being experienced disproportionately by younger generations.

Successive generations are predicted to experience progressively greater unprecedented lifetime exposure (ULE) events such as heat waves. About 111 million children born in 2020 will live with unprecedented heatwave exposure in a world that warms by 3.5 °C, compared with 62 million with only 1.5 °C of warming.

The Held case is based on the constitutional right to a "clean and healthful environment in Montana for present and future generations".^{:Art. IX, § 1}

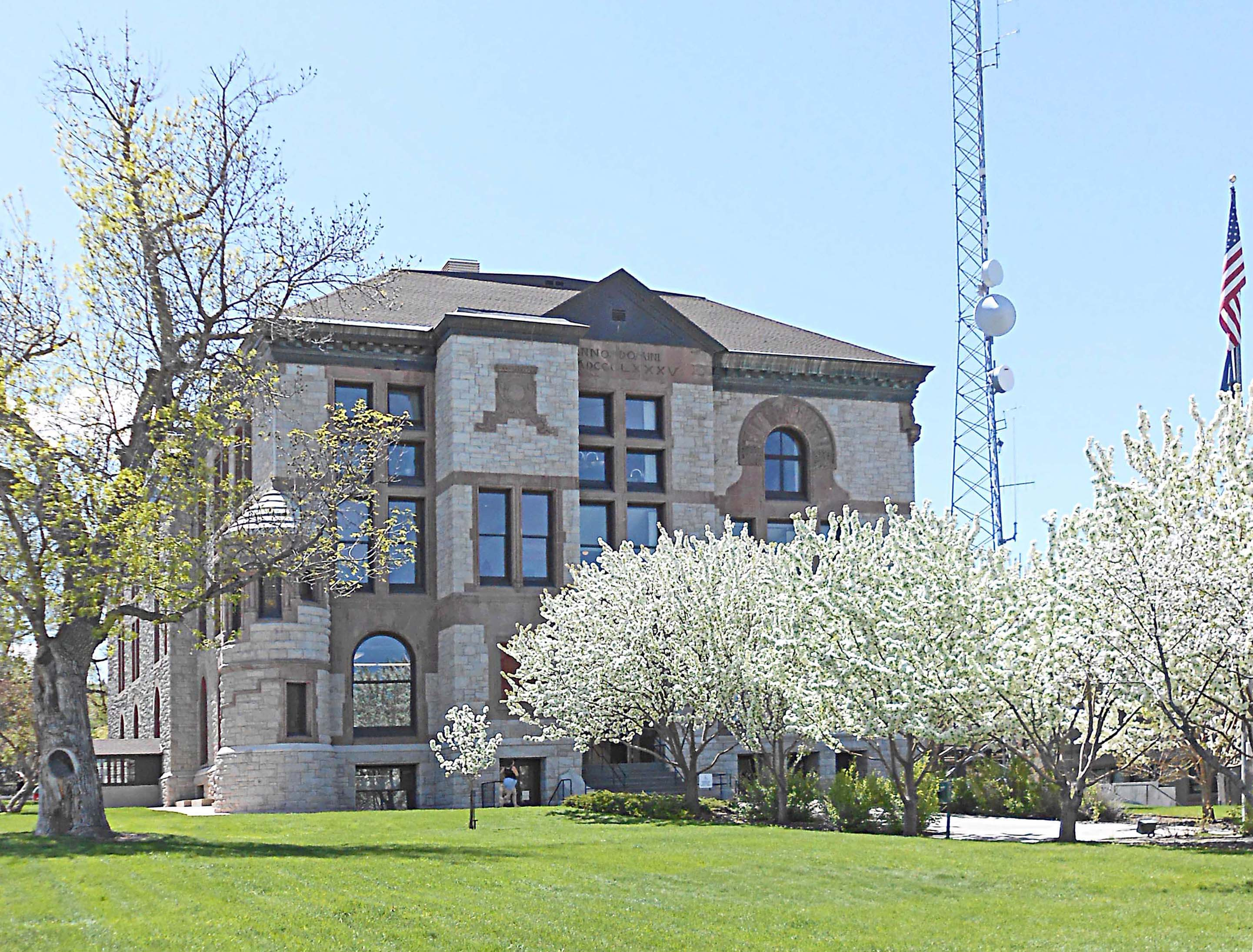
Lewis and Clark County Courthouse

The lawsuit is based in part on the state’s constitution as amended in 1972, whose Article IX (Environment and Natural Resources) requires that the "state and each person shall maintain and improve a clean and healthful environment in Montana for present and future generations". This passage follows Article II (Declaration of Rights), Section 3 (Inalienable Rights), which states that "All persons are born free and have certain inalienable rights. They include the right to a clean and healthful environment..."

The 2020 Held complaint^{:"Nature of the Action", § 4} challenged the constitutionality of two Montana statutes: (1) the State Energy Policy, which directs statewide energy production and use, and (2) the "climate change exception" in the MEPA, which prohibits the state from considering how its energy economy may contribute to climate change. Lawmakers repealed the State Energy Policy before trial, causing the claim against it to be dismissed.

The complaint did not seek financial compensation, but a declaration that the state had violated their constitutional rights. In addition, the complaint asked the court to prohibit the state from "subjecting Youth plaintiffs" to the unconstitutional laws, to prepare a complete and accurate accounting of the state's greenhouse gas (GHG) emissions, and to require the state to develop a remedial plan or policies to reduce GHG emissions.^{:"Prayer for Relief", pp. 102–104}

The plaintiffs and the state must file proposed findings, due in early July, before the judge makes a ruling. A judge, not a jury, decides constitutional issues.

== Factual issues ==
Plaintiffs' opening statement referred to "heat, drought, wildfires, air pollution, violent storms, loss of wildlife, watching glaciers melt," saying medical and psychological impacts disproportionately impact young people. During their five-day presentation of their case, almost all of the plaintiffs themselves testified, as did eight plaintiffs' expert witnesses on topics including climate change, renewable energy, energy policy in Montana, and children's physical and mental health.

The youth plaintiffs testified as to how they had been harmed by climate change, including impacts from wildfires and related evacuations; extreme temperatures and drought; changing river flow patterns; damage to infrastructure, farms, and businesses; fear of the future, and a sense of loss of control. Native American youths testified as to how their traditional ceremonies and food had been affected.

One of the plaintiffs' experts, climate scientist and former IPCC member Steven Running, presented the science underlying climate change, from the greenhouse effect through its impacts specific to Montana. Another expert, Stockholm Environment Institute researcher Peter Erickson, testified that Montana emits more greenhouse gases than some entire countries, comparing the emissions created by the energy consumed within the state’s borders in 2019 to the amount emitted by Ireland in the same year. Clinical psychiatrist Lise Van Susteren, co-founder of the Climate Psychiatry Alliance, described the emotional toll on the plaintiffs when they recognize what lies in their future, characterizing their experience as "pretraumatic stress". (Note: Pretraumatic stress reactions involve "intrusive involuntary images of possible future stressful events and their associated avoidance and increased arousal". A test to measure pretraumatic stress reactions in soldiers "significantly predicted" the soldiers' levels of post traumatic stress symptoms during and after their deployment to a war zone. Source: Berntsen, Dorthe; Rubin, David C. (November 26, 2014). "Pretraumatic Stress Reactions in Soldiers Deployed to Afghanistan". Clinical Psychological Science. 3 (5): 663–674. doi:10.1177/2167702614551766. hdl:10161/12023. PMC 4564108. PMID 26366328.) Mark Jacobson, director of the atmosphere and energy program at Stanford University, testified that the state could transition from fossil fuels—providing ~75% of Montana’s 2018 energy consumption—to having 92% of its energy from renewable sources, in part because Montana's large land area has 330 times the wind energy potential needed to power the entire state. The case is rare in that it involves questioning climate experts on the witness stand.

In the defense's case, Montana Assistant Attorney General Michael Russell asserted that the court "will hear lots of emotion, lots of assumptions, accusations", but that climate change "is a global issue that effectively relegates Montana's role to that of a spectator", with "Montana’s emissions (being) simply too minuscule to make any difference". Some scholars called the state's argument—referring to emissions occurring outside Montana—"whataboutism". Russell also said that the plaintiffs' case tried to turn a "procedural matter" into "a weeklong hearing of political grievances that properly belong to the legislature and not a court of law." Although the trial was originally scheduled to last two weeks, it lasted seven days. The state’s attorneys called only three witnesses in its single-day case, closing their case at the end of the sixth day of trial. The state declined to call its only mental health witness to the stand. Also, a written report by climate change contrarian Judith Curry—the state's sole climate science witness—was not entered into the record, nor did Curry testify as originally planned.

== Ruling and appeal ==
Judge Seeley's August 14, 2023 judgment ruled in favor of the youth plaintiffs, declaring the 2023 version of the MEPA limitation (HB 971) and a similar 2023 law (SB 557) to be unconstitutional. The judge's 103-page ruling concluded that the "MEPA Limitation violates Youth Plaintiffs' right to a clean and healthful environment and is unconstitutional on its face". The ruling stated that the MEPA limitation's prohibition against analysis of greenhouse gas (GHG) emissions, their impacts on the climate, and their contributions to climate change, were inconsistent with the Montana Constitution.

Montana Attorney General Austin Knudsen's spokesperson called the case a "taxpayer-funded publicity stunt" and said that Judge Seeley's ruling was "absurd", the AG's office saying it would appeal the ruling. Montana's Supreme Court heard oral arguments on July 10, 2024, its seven justices taking the case under advisement. On December 18, 2024, the court upheld the county court ruling.

== Context and impact ==
At the time of trial, Department of Environmental Quality Director Chris Dorrington said that permitting practices would not change if the plaintiffs prevailed, as the agency does not have the authority to refuse to issue a permit that complies with the law. Furthermore, DEQ Air, Energy and Mining Division Administrator Sonja Nowakowski distinguished procedural laws such as that being challenged, from regulatory laws that can be used as a basis to refuse a permit—saying plaintiff's only redress is to challenge specific permitting decisions.

The Held decision would not be binding on other states because states' courts separately interpret their respective laws. Also, at trial the judge said that even if the plaintiffs prevail, she would not order officials to formulate a new approach to address climate change. However, the judge could issue a declaratory judgment saying officials violated the state constitution. That declaratory judgment would set a legal precedent for courts to consider cases normally governed by the legislative and executive branches.

In August 2023, The New York Times and The Washington Post described Held as a "landmark" climate case. Bloomberg described it as a "historic case on harm from climate change". The Post said that it was the "first ruling of its kind nationwide." The Guardian called it a "game changer". Our Children's Trust's founder, Julia Olson, noted that Held v. Montana marked the first time in U.S. history that the merits of a case led a court to rule that a government violated young people’s constitutional rights by promoting fossil fuel usage.

== Further legal action ==
On December 9, 2025, Our Children's Trust filed a petition at the Montana State Supreme Court asking it to declare as unconstitutional, new laws prohibiting Montana from enacting air pollution rules that are more stringent than federal regulations, and that generally limit the scope and power of state environmental reviews. In one example, one of the Trust's attorneys said that the contested laws allowed state officials to consider only greenhouse gas emissions from activity at a coal mine and not emissions created when that coal is burned.

== Similar cases ==
- Juliana v. United States, a case filed in 2015 in which 21 young people sued the federal government for violating their constitutional rights to life, liberty, and property by enacting policies that support fossil fuel interests. In June 2023, the case was permitted to proceed to trial in federal court. A three-judge Ninth Circuit panel ruled on May 1, 2024, that the Juliana plaintiffs lacked standing and ordered the lower court to dismiss the case with no option to amend their filings. In March 2025, the US Supreme Court declined to hear the appeal, in effect letting the dismissal stand.
- On May 29, 2025, Lighthiser v. Trump was filed on behalf of 22 youth plaintiffs through Our Children's Trust in Butte, Montana, 68 miles from the Held venue in Helena. The 22 Lighthiser youth plaintiffs include ten from the Held suit.

== See also ==
- Climate change litigation
- Climate justice
- Just transition
- Fossil fuel divestment
- List of environmental lawsuits
- Climate change in the United States
- Steve Held, father of lead plaintiff Rikki Held
