= Lise Van Susteren =

American psychiatrist

Lise Van Susteren (born March 7, 1951) is an American psychiatrist, commentator, author and environmental activist. She is a general and forensic psychiatrist in Washington, D.C., and an expert on the physical and psychological impacts of climate change.

Van Susteren has founded several national organizations to raise public awareness of climate change and to advocate for environmental policies including the Climate Psychiatry Alliance and the Climate Psychology Alliance of North America.

== Background ==
Van Susteren received her medical degree in 1982 from the University of Paris. She interned at the Hospital St. Anne and the American Hospital of Paris and at Hospital Tokoin in Lomé, Togo. She completed her residency training in psychiatry at St. Elizabeths Hospital in Washington, D.C. Van Susteren is board certified in general and forensic psychiatry. She has worked as an assistant clinical professor of psychiatry at Georgetown University Department of Psychiatry, and as a consultant to the Central Intelligence Agency. conducting psychological assessments of world leaders, and at community mental health centers in the metropolitan Washington, D.C., area.

Van Susteren is a volunteer with Physicians for Human Rights., evaluating and testifying on behalf of torture victims seeking political asylum in the United States. She has been a volunteer reader for the Metropolitan Washington Ear., an organization that records written material for the blind, and as a volunteer provider at homeless shelters, for victims of Hurricane Katrina, and the 2010 Haiti earthquake. In 1984, Van Susteren co-founded The Friends of St. Elizabeths, a nonprofit organization dedicated to the humane treatment of the mentally ill and the historic preservation of St. Elizabeths Hospital.

== Climate change activism ==
In 2006, former Vice President Al Gore trained Van Susteren at The Climate Project to educate the public about climate change. She was named to the board of directors of The Climate Project in 2009. Van Susteren speaks frequently to civic, educational, religious, labor, and environmental groups about the impacts of climate change, particularly the health impacts, in the Washington, D.C., area, nationally, and abroad. In 2009, she organized the first conference to focus on the psychological impacts of climate change. She co-authored "The Psychological Effects of Global Warming on the United States: And Why the U.S. Health Care System is Not Adequately Prepared".

Van Susteren serves on the boards of Earth Day Network, Physicians for Social Responsibility, ecoAmerica, Chesapeake Climate Action Network, and Climate Mobilization. She is a past member of the boards of the Center for Health and the Global Environment at Harvard University's T.H. Chan School of Public Health, and the National Wildlife Federation. She also served on the Climate Energy and Environmental Committee of the Metropolitan Washington Council of Governments in Washington, DC and the Policy Advisory Board of Gender Rights Maryland.

Van Susteren was an expert witness on the psychological damages to children in the case of Juliana vs US. She was also an expert witness in Held v. Montana, in which youth plaintiffs asserted that state support of fossil fuels denied their constitutional right to a "clean and healthful environment."

Van Susteren is a co-founder of Interfaith Moral Action on Climate, a multi-faith coalition dedicated to organizing people of religion and spirituality to speak out against climate change. She is also a co-founder of the Climate Psychiatry Alliance and the Climate Psychology Alliance, both of which are dedicated to the education of mental health professionals and the public about the impacts of climate disruption on our mental health and the need for systemic change to address the threat to public health.

Van Susteren ran for the US Senate seat in Maryland held by retiring Senator Paul Sarbanes in the Democratic primary in 2006.

Van Susteren is the founder and CEO of "Lucky Planet Foods," a company dedicated to providing low-carbon, plant-based, healthy foods for sustainable living.

== Publications ==
In 2020, Van Susteren released a book, Emotional Inflammation: Discover Your Triggers and Reclaim Your Equilibrium During Anxious Times, to speak to the feelings of anxiety people experienced due to the Coronavirus-19 pandemic of 2020–2021.

She co-authored the 2013 piece, "Assessing 'Dangerous Climate Change': Required Reduction of Carbon Emissions to Protect Young People, Future Generations and Nature", an open-access peer-reviewed scientific journal published by the Public Library of Science with James Hansen as the principal author.

Van Susteren has contributed an article to the British Journal of Psychiatry in 2018, where she wrote an opinion piece titled "The Psychological Impacts of the Climate Crisis: A Call to Action".

Van Susteren has written chapters for books such as Health of People and Planet: Our Responsibility, where she speaks about the psychological impacts of climate change and recommendations for solutions in her chapter "The Global Climate Crisis: Psychological Aspects", which was published in May 2020 by Springer Publishing. Van Susteren has also contributed to the book titled: The Dangerous Case of Donald Trump, writing a chapter titled "The Age of Thanatos: Environmental Consequences of the Trump Presidency".

Van Susteren is a frequent commentator on television and published a blog at the Huffington Post. She hosted a weekly radio segment on WTNT (AM)-570's The Paul Berry Show called The Doctor Is In. Her publications in professional journals include articles on the Insanity Defense, Post-Traumatic Stress Disorder, and Psychiatric Abandonment.

== Family ==
Van Susteren's father, Urban Van Susteren, was an elected judge in Appleton, Wisconsin.

She has two siblings: Dirk Van Susteren, a journalist, and broadcast journalist Greta Van Susteren.

Van Susteren's husband is Jonathan Kempner, president emeritus of TIGER 21. He was a Harvard Advance Leadership Initiative Fellow in 2019. They have three daughters.
