= Vic Barrett =

American climate activist

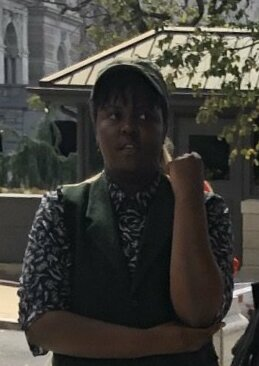
- Vic Barrett, in 2019
- Born: c. 1998 or 1999 (age 26–27)
- Citizenship: United States
- Organization: Our Children's Trust
- Movement: Climate justice

Vic Barrett (born c. 1998 or 1999) is an American climate activist. He was a plaintiff in the dismissed Juliana v. United States lawsuit, which has been called likely the most ambitious and aggressive climate change lawsuit filed to date. Barrett also featured in a documentary about the case, Youth v. Gov.

== Activism ==
Barrett traces an early influence to rising sea levels outside his grandparents' home in Honduras. “It was the first thing about climate change that hit really close to home. And it made me realize the global implications of how climate change affects everyone.” Barrett's first experience with climate activism came after experiencing the effects of Hurricane Sandy on New York City neighborhoods in 2012.

As a ninth grader in 2013-14 at Notre Dame School, an all-girls Catholic high school in Manhattan, Barrett joined the Global Kids organization working to mandate climate education in New York City public schools from kindergarten through 12th grade. In 2014, through Global Kids, Barrett took a three-week trip to Bosnia sponsored by and conducted by the U.S. State Department.

Though Global Kids, Barrett connected with the Alliance for Climate Education. Mentors at those two organizations thought Barrett would be a good addition to the landmark lawsuit that Our Children's Trust was putting together, known as Juliana v. United States. The Juliana case has regularly been trumpeted as the "trial of the century," a climate Scopes trial, to demonstrate the urgency of climate change and force federal action. The lawsuit was filed on behalf of 21 children not old enough to vote. After nine years of legal wrangling, including a stop at the U.S. Supreme Court, the lawsuit was dismissed by the Ninth Circuit Court of Appeals on May 1, 2024.

In December 2015, Barrett spoke at COP21, the United Nations Climate Change Conference in Paris. In December 2018, Barrett prominently protested at COP24 in Poland, calling U.S. energy policy "a joke."

In 2019, Barrett appeared in Ilana Glazer's Generator Series and promoted the September 2019 climate strike and spoke at the NYC strike in Foley Square. Barrett was nominated for a Pritzker Award from the UCLA Institute of the Environment and Sustainability in 2020. He is currently a network organizer for the Power Shift Network. Barrett has spoken about the power of storytelling in engaging people in activism. The time commitment, including trips to Washington, D.C. and San Francisco for case related appearances, led him to withdraw from his undergraduate studies in political science at the University of Wisconsin-Madison.

== Personal life ==
Barrett is from White Plains, New York, and resides in the Bronx as of August 2023. He is neurodivergent, queer and of Garifuna descent. Barrett is also a first-generation American and a trans man who transitioned in 2017, after moving away for college in Wisconsin. Barrett has a tattoo that refers to the atmospheric carbon dioxide concentration in parts per million. He has identified Berta Cáceres as a personal hero.
