= Alicemarie Huber Stotler =

American judge

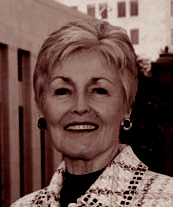

Senior Judge of the United States District Court for the Central District of California
- In office January 5, 2009 – June 9, 2014

Chief Judge of the United States District Court for the Central District of California
- In office 2005–2009
- Preceded by: Consuelo Bland Marshall
- Succeeded by: Audrey B. Collins

Judge of the United States District Court for the Central District of California
- In office May 3, 1984 – January 5, 2009
- Appointed by: Ronald Reagan
- Preceded by: Robert J. Kelleher
- Succeeded by: Josephine Staton

Personal details
- Born: May 29, 1942 Alhambra, California
- Died: June 9, 2014 (aged 72) Yorba Linda, California
- Education: University of Southern California (B.A.); USC Gould School of Law (J.D.)

Alicemarie Huber Stotler (May 29, 1942 – June 9, 2014) was a United States district judge of the United States District Court for the Central District of California.

== Education and career ==
Born in Alhambra, California, Stotler, who was of German descent, received a Bachelor of Arts degree from the University of Southern California in 1964 and a Juris Doctor from the USC Gould School of Law in 1967. Stotler was a deputy district attorney of Orange County, California, from 1967 to 1973. She was in private practice in Tustin, California from 1973 to 1976. She was a municipal court judge for the Harbor Judicial District in Newport Beach, California from 1976 to 1978. She was a Justice pro tempore of the Fourth District Court of Appeal, Division Two, in San Bernardino, California in 1977. She was a judge of the Orange County Superior Court from 1978 to 1983. She returned to private practice in Newport Beach from 1983 to 1984.

== Federal judicial service ==
On April 4, 1984, Stotler was nominated by President Ronald Reagan to a seat on the United States District Court for the Central District of California vacated by Judge Robert J. Kelleher. She was confirmed by the United States Senate on May 1, 1984, and received her commission on May 3, 1984. She served as Chief Judge from 2005 to 2009, and assumed senior status on January 5, 2009 until her death on June 9, 2014.

== Sources ==
Legal offices
Preceded by Robert J. Kelleher	Judge of the United States District Court for the Central District of California; 1984–2009	Succeeded by Josephine Staton
Preceded by Consuelo Bland Marshall	Chief Judge of the United States District Court for the Central District of California; 2005–2009	Succeeded by Audrey B. Collins
