= Xiuhtezcatl Martinez =

American rapper and climate activist

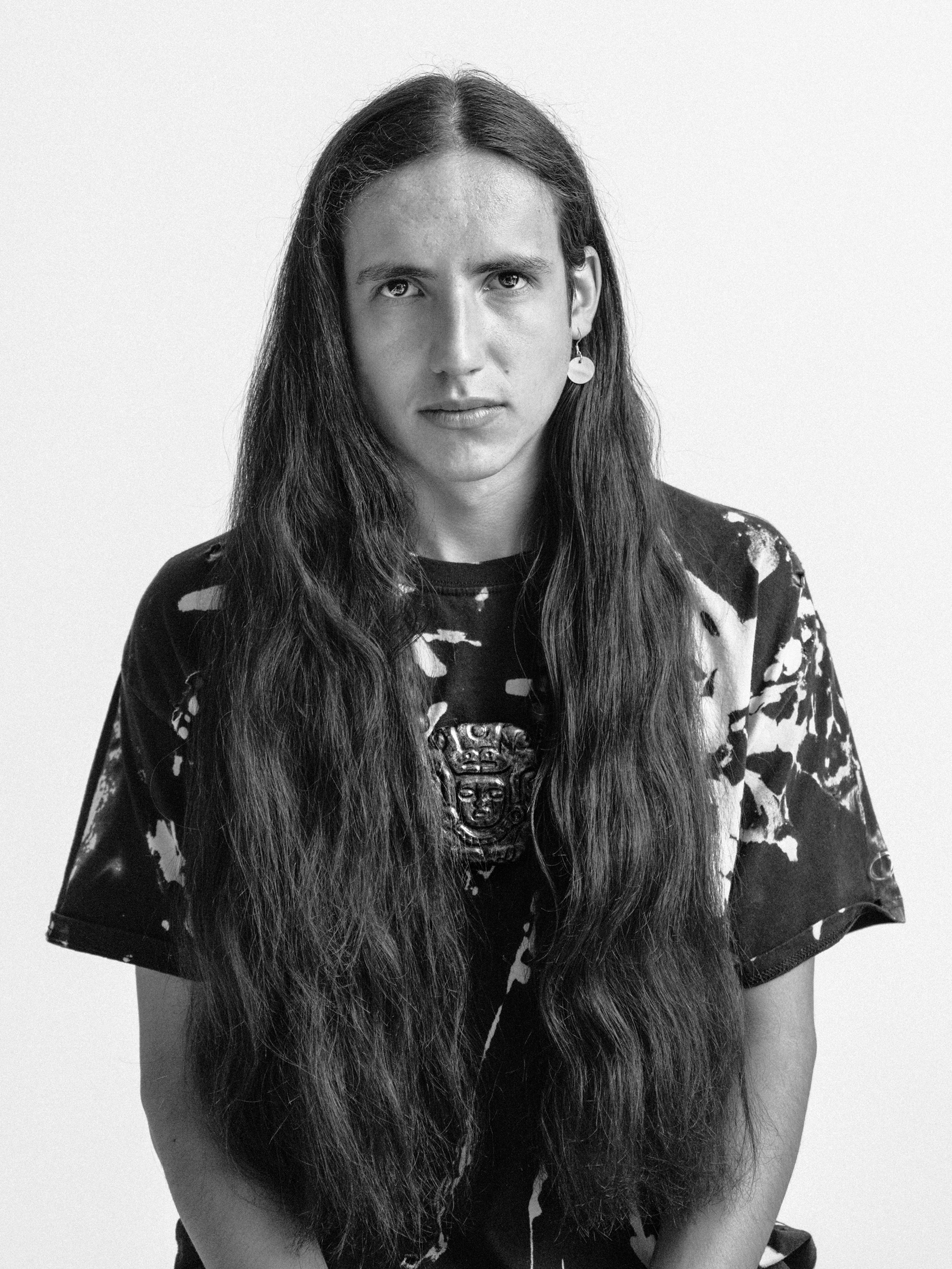
- Martinez in 2016
- Born: Xiuhtezcatl Martinez; May 9, 2000 (age 26); Colorado, U.S.
- Occupations: Environmental activist; Rapper; Singer
- Website: www.xiuhtezcatl.com

Xiuhtezcatl Roske-Martinez (/ʃuːˈtɛzkɑːt/ shoo-TEZ-kaht; born May 9, 2000), also known by the initial X, (Note: Martinez uses the initial X on his official website and social media.) is an American environmental activist and hip hop artist. Martinez was the Youth Director of Earth Guardians until 2019.

Martinez has spoken about the effects of fossil fuels. He has spoken at the United Nations several times, and he gained popularity after delivering a 2015 speech at the United Nations General Assembly in English, Spanish, and Nahuatl.

Martinez was one of 21 plaintiffs involved in Juliana v. United States, a lawsuit filed in 2015 against the U.S. government for failing to act on climate change. In May 2024, the U.S. Court of Appeals for the Ninth Circuit dismissed the case. Martinez was also one of seven plaintiffs in the Martinez v. Colorado Oil and Gas Conservation Commission case; that 2013 case is a state-level lawsuit similar to Juliana v. United States. In January 2019 the Colorado Supreme Court ruled against the plaintiffs.

== Family ==
Martinez was born in Colorado, but moved to Mexico in his infancy. He lived with his family in Boulder, Colorado through 2019 moving later to Portland, Oregon. His mother, Tamara Roske, was one of the founders of the Earth Guardian Community Resource Center, a high school in Maui, Hawaii. Roske served as Executive Director of Earth Guardians until May 2021. Martinez has two younger siblings, sister Tonantzin and brother Itzcuauhtli. His father, Siri Martinez, raised him with an appreciation for the tradition of the Mexica, one of the historic Indigenous peoples of Mexico, today often grouped under the Nahua. As part of this heritage, Martinez believes the individual is a part of the natural world; therefore, he sees abuse of nature as "the tearing apart of a fragile and revered system".

== Activism ==
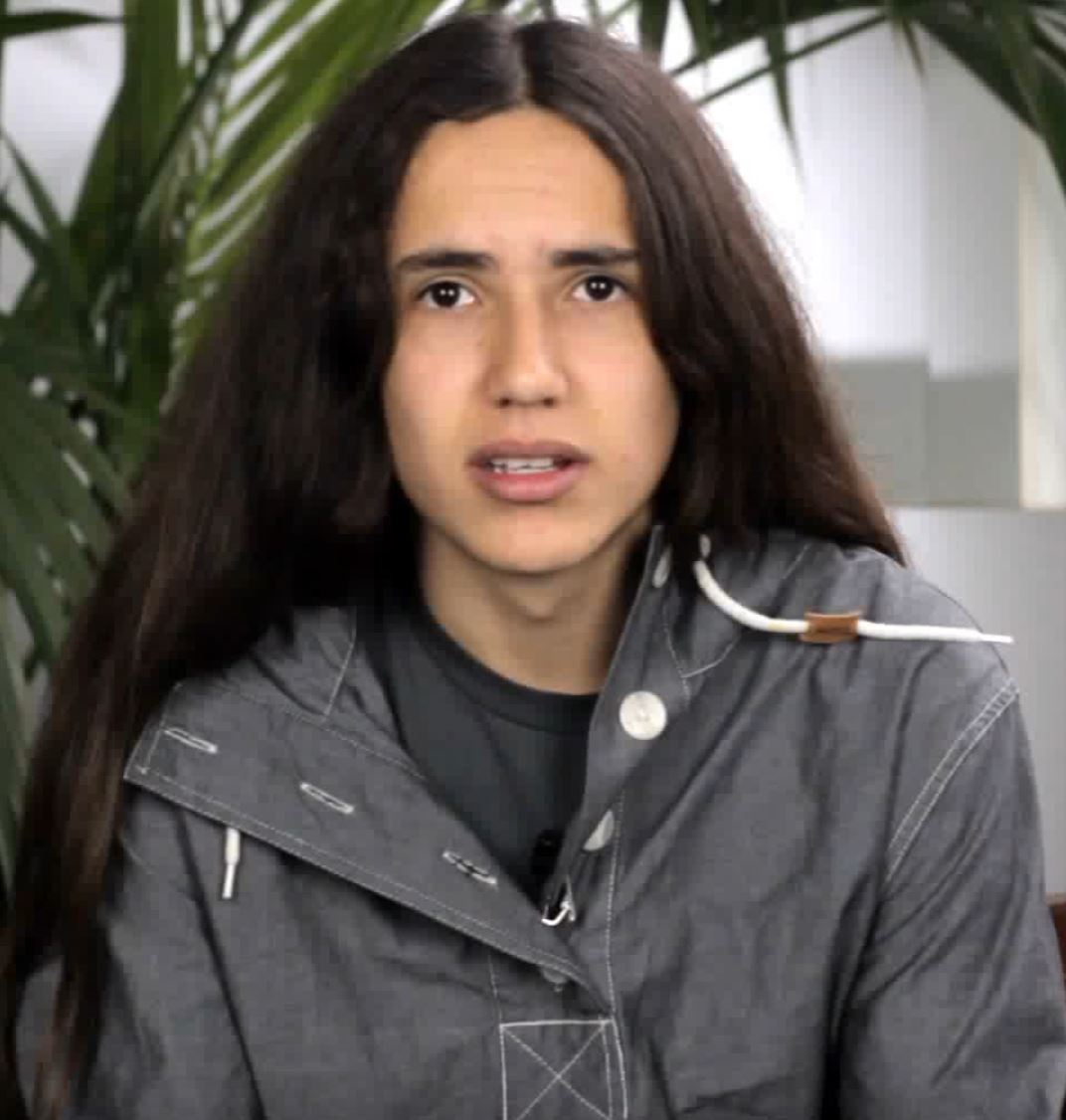
Martinez in 2016

As a child, his first foray into activism was an appeal in 2009 to a Colorado city council to prohibit pesticides in city parks. "I was like, yo, like let’s do something about this, so I called up my mom. I was like, yo, Mom, help me get a bunch of kids together to do something about this...And, like, we changed the law."

As a teenager, Martinez gave TED talks and was invited to speak before the United Nations on environmental policy. In June 2015, he spoke at the age of 15 in English, Spanish, and Nahuatl before the UN General Assembly on Climate Change. Martinez urged immediate climate action saying, "What's at stake right now is the existence of my generation."

That same year, he competed with young musicians from around the world who submitted self-produced music "to inspire the negotiations" at the United Nations Framework Convention on Climate Change with their music; Martinez's selection "Speak for the Trees" was chosen as the Jury Award Winner.

Martinez asserts that education and young people are key elements of the movement for significant social and environmental change: "The marching in the streets, the lifestyle changes haven't been enough so something drastic needs to happen. The change that we need is not going to come from a politician, from an orangutan in office, it's going to come from something that's always been the driver of change – people power, power of young people." When addressing the criticism of young people overusing technology in a 2016 interview with Bill Maher, Martinez noted that technology also brings people together to focus on a shared concern: "I think it's an important tool that we have for networking and connecting with people. Social media and technology – it's either a downfall and distraction for our generation, or a powerful tool we can use."

He grew up as a vegetarian never having eaten any meat and is now a vegan. He speaks out about the meat industry: "I’m very passionate about the idea that reconnecting to our food is a really important step towards healing our relationship with our planet and breaking free from a corrupt, broken food system that targets marginalized communities and profits off of our suffering."

=== Earth Guardians ===
Earth Guardians is an environmental activist organization founded in 1992 by his family. Martinez served as the Youth Director through 2019, transitioning to co-Youth Director alongside Marlow Baines, who assumed the youth leadership role in 2020. Earth Guardians' mission is to "inspire and train diverse youth to be effective leaders in the environmental, climate and social justice movements. Through the power of art, music, storytelling, civic engagement, and legal action, we're creating impactful solutions to some of the most critical issues we face as a global community." They work to organize climate strikes, cultivate environmentally focused policy, and encourage individual activism through promoting voting registration.

=== Climate change lawsuits ===
In 2013, he and six other youths filed a lawsuit against the state government of Colorado. He was the lead plaintiff in Martinez v. Colorado Oil and Gas Conservation Commission case. In January 2019, the Colorado Supreme Court reversed a lower court judgment and concluded that the Commission properly declined to engage in rulemaking to consider the plaintiff's proposed rule. Later in the month the plaintiffs asked the supreme court to reconsider its decision, but the court declined.

In 2015, Martinez and 21 other youths filed a lawsuit against the US Federal government, Juliana et al. v United States et al.. They argued that the federal government was denying their constitutional right to life, liberty and property by ignoring climate change. The plaintiffs originally included parties from the fossil fuel industry as defendants in the lawsuit but they were removed during pre-trial proceedings. The plaintiffs ranged in age from 9 to 20 and 10 of the children have either Black or Indigenous backgrounds. After years of legal wrangling, on May 1, 2024, the lawsuit was dismissed.

=== Political endorsements ===
In April 2019, Martinez wrote an op-ed in Teen Vogue endorsing Bernie Sanders for president, stating, "I believe Bernie Sanders has our back on climate change". In December 2018, Martinez spoke with Sanders at a town hall event called "Solving the Climate Crisis".

== Awards ==
Martinez was awarded the U.S. Volunteer Service Award by President Barack Obama in 2013. In 2017, he was included on Rolling Stone's "25 under 25" list of young people who will change the world. In 2018, he received a Generation Change Award at the MTV Europe Music Awards. In December 2018, Remezcla named Martinez to their list of "30 Latinxs Who Made an Impact in Their Communities in 2018."

== Books ==
- Imaginary Borders (Penguin Workshop Pocket Change Collective 2020)
- We Rise: The Earth Guardians Guide to Building a Movement That Restores the Planet (Rodale Books 2017)

== Filmography ==
In 2020, he appeared in the Netflix documentary Youth v Gov about the Juliana case.

In 2021, he appeared as one of the activists in the French documentary film Bigger Than Us.

== Music ==
Xiuhtezcatl released his first album, Break Free, in 2018. The album features stic.man from hip-hop group Dead Prez as well as actress Shailene Woodley.

His third album TONATIUH was released in September 2025. It features several indigenous artists, including Oglala Lakota hip-hop musician Mato Wayuhi; Dakota, Dine, and Ho-Chunk comedian Dallas Goldtooth; Quechua singer Renata Flores; as well as Nathan Willett of rock band Cold War Kids.

In November 2025, Xiuhtezcatl collaborated with fellow activist-musician Cain Culto on the single ¡Basta Ya!.

== See also ==
- Climate change mitigation
