= American Electric Power Co. v. Connecticut =

American Electric Power Company v. Connecticut
- Supreme Court of the United States

Argued April 19, 2011 Decided June 20, 2011
- Full case name: American Electric Power Company, Inc., et al., v. Connecticut
- Docket no.: 10-174
- Citations: 564 U.S. 410 (more) 131 S. Ct. 2527; 180 L. Ed. 2d 435

Case history
- Prior: Dismissed, 406 F. Supp. 2d 265 (S.D.N.Y. 2005); vacated and remanded, 582 F.3d 309 (2nd Cir. 2009); certiorari granted, 562 U.S. 1091 (2010).

Holding
- 1. The Second Circuit’s exercise of jurisdiction is affirmed by an equally divided Court. / 2. The Clean Air Act and the EPA action the Act authorizes displace any federal common-law right to seek abatement of carbon-dioxide emissions from fossil-fuel fired power plants.

Court membership
- Chief Justice John Roberts Associate Justices Antonin Scalia · Anthony Kennedy; Clarence Thomas · Ruth Bader Ginsburg; Stephen Breyer · Samuel Alito; Sonia Sotomayor · Elena Kagan

Case opinions
- Majority: Ginsburg, joined by Roberts, Scalia, Kennedy, Breyer, Kagan
- Concurrence: Alito (in part), joined by Thomas
- Sotomayor took no part in the consideration or decision of the case.

American Electric Power Company v. Connecticut, 564 U.S. 410 (2011), was a United States Supreme Court case in which the Court, in an 8–0 decision, held that corporations cannot be sued for greenhouse gas emissions (GHGs) under federal common law, primarily because the Clean Air Act (CAA) delegates the management of carbon dioxide and other GHG emissions to the Environmental Protection Agency (EPA). Brought to court in July 2004 in the Southern District of New York, this was the first global warming case based on a public nuisance claim.

== Case overview ==
Eight states, the City of New York, and three land trusts, separately sued the same electric power corporations that owned and operated fossil-fuel-fired power plants in twenty states. The plaintiffs sought to cap-and-abate the defendants' GHG emissions under public nuisance law due to ongoing contributions to global warming. They alleged that the defendants are the five largest emitters of GHGs in the United States, collectively emitting 650 million tons of carbon dioxide annually. The plaintiffs claimed that by contributing to global warming the defendants are violating the federal common law of interstate nuisance.

The United States District Court for the Southern District of New York dismissed both groups of plaintiffs' federal common law nuisance claims as non-justiciable under the political question doctrine, and the plaintiffs appealed. The United States Court of Appeals for the Second Circuit vacated and remanded. The Second Circuit held that the lawsuits were not barred by the political question doctrine, and the plaintiffs had adequately alleged Article III standing. Certiorari was granted by the United States Supreme Court.

== Parties ==
State plaintiffs in the case. New Jersey and Wisconsin, in light red, eventually withdrew. The Supreme Court held that state parties had standing following the precedent of Massachusetts v. Environmental Protection Agency.

=== Plaintiffs ===
One group of plaintiffs was composed of the City of New York and eight states, including: California, Connecticut, Iowa, New Jersey, New York, Rhode Island, Vermont, and Wisconsin. However, New Jersey and Wisconsin eventually withdrew from the case. The other group of plaintiffs included three nonprofit land trusts: The Open Space Institute, the Open Space Conservancy, and the Audubon Society of New Hampshire.

=== Defendants ===
The defendants were five private electric power companies: American Electric Power Co., American Electric Power Service Corp., Cinergy Co., Southern Co. Inc. of Georgia, and Xcel Energy Inc. of Minnesota, and the federal Tennessee Valley Authority.

== Issues ==
1. Whether states, cities, and private parties have standing to seek emissions caps on utilities for their alleged contribution to climate change.
2. Whether a cause of action to regulate carbon dioxide emissions can be inferred under federal common law even though the Clean Air Act designates authority for the regulation of greenhouse gas emissions to the EPA.

== Noted cases ==
Two Supreme Court cases played significant roles in the decisions made by the courts.

=== Baker v. Carr (1962) - Political Questions Doctrine ===
In Baker v. Carr, the main issue was deciding if redistricting (attempts to change the way voting districts are delineated) presents justiciable questions, which would allow federal courts to hear the case, or whether the case presented a political question. Any case that is deemed a "political question" cannot be resolved by federal courts. In the decision, Justice Brennan identified six factors to help determine which questions are political in nature. The six factors are:

- Is there a textually demonstrable constitutional commitment of the issue to a coordinate political department (i.e. foreign affairs or executive war powers)?
- Is there a lack of judicially discoverable and manageable standards for resolving the issue?
- The impossibility of deciding the issue without an initial policy determination of a kind clearly for nonjudicial discretion.
- The impossibility of a court's undertaking independent resolution without expressing lack of the respect due coordinate branches of government.
- Is there an unusual need for unquestioning adherence to a political decision already made?
- Would attempting to resolve the matter create the possibility of embarrassment from multifarious pronouncements by various departments on one question?

This ruling is significant in American Electric Power v. Connecticut because, using the six-factor test established in Baker v. Carr, the district court dismissed the plaintiffs' suit for presenting a non-justiciable political question because of the "impossibility of deciding the issue without an initial policy determination of a kind clearly for nonjudicial discretion." However, the Second Circuit reversed this decision and, using the six-factor test, determined that the plaintiffs were not barred by the political question doctrine.

=== Massachusetts v. Environmental Protection Agency (2007) ===
In Massachusetts v. Environmental Protection Agency, the court held that the CAA gives the EPA the task of regulating carbon dioxide and other GHG emissions. This is significant in the American Electrical Power v. Connecticut case because it establishes that carbon dioxide and GHG emissions regulations set by the EPA supersede federal common law. The EPA started phasing in requirements that new or modified GHG emitting facilities use the best available control technology (BACT) and started a rulemaking to set limits on GHG emissions from new, modified, and existing fossil-fuel fired power plants. The case of American Electric Power v. Connecticut started in 2004, well before the EPA began to regulate GHGs.

Based on Massachusetts v. Environmental Protection Agency, which permitted states to challenge EPA's refusal to regulate GHGs and effectively gave states a lower standing threshold than private parties, in American Electrical Power v. Connecticut the Supreme Court held that at least some of the plaintiffs had Article III standing, specifically the states.

== Procedural history ==
=== United States District Court for the Southern District of New York ===
The plaintiffs claimed that GHG emissions from the defendants' power plants have significantly contributed to global warming. By contributing to global warming, the defendants were violating the federal common law of interstate nuisance. According to the states and New York City, climate change poses risks to public lands, infrastructure, and human health. The private land trusts claimed climate change may cause destruction of habitat of rare species, trees and plants inhabiting land owned by the trusts.

The defendants filed a motion to dismiss based on failure to state a claim upon which relief can be granted and for lack of subject matter jurisdiction. The defendants claimed the plaintiffs raised a political question that was unfit for adjudication by the courts. The District Court dismissed both suits, stating they were non-justiciable matters that raised a political question that can only be addressed by the legislative or executive branches, leaving the court without jurisdiction.

=== United States Court of Appeals for the Second Circuit ===
The United States Court of Appeals for the Second Circuit reversed the judgement of the district court, holding that the political question doctrine did not bar the plaintiffs' case from adjudication by using the six-factor test from Baker v. Carr. The Second Circuit also held that the plaintiffs had adequately alleged Article III standing under the federal common law of nuisance and maintained that states may bring suit to abate air and water pollution produced by other states or by out-of-state industry as stated in Illinois v. Milwaukee. The Second Circuit also held that the CAA did not displace federal common law of nuisance because it is a federal common law issue when dealing with ambient or interstate air and water as stated in Milwaukee I. In a ruling in September 2009, the Second Circuit determined the EPA failed to publicize any regulations pertaining to GHG emissions and could not speculate whether the hypothetical regulation of GHGs under the CAA would pertain to the issues raised by the plaintiffs. Based on that fact, the Second Circuit denied defendants' request for rehearing. The Supreme Court granted certiorari on December 6, 2010.

== Supreme Court ruling ==
Oral arguments
Recording of oral arguments before the Supreme Court.

On June 20, 2011, Justice Ginsburg delivered the opinion of the Court, with Justices Roberts, Scalia, Kennedy, Breyer, and Kagan joining. Justice Alito filed an opinion concurring in part and concurring in the judgement, which Justice Thomas joined. Justice Sotomayor took no part in the consideration or decision of the case as, prior to her elevation to the Supreme Court, she heard the case as a Second Circuit judge. The Supreme Court rejected the plaintiffs' claim and the Second Circuit's holding that federal common law is not displaced since the EPA had not exercised its authority by setting emissions standards for the defendants' plants. However, after the Second Circuit delivered its opinion and prior to the Supreme Court's judgment, the EPA had taken several relevant actions following Massachusetts v. Environmental Protection Agency, which included issuing the Endangerment Finding and establishing the Tailoring Rule, affecting the nation's largest greenhouse gas emitters. With the ruling in Massachusetts v. Environmental Protection Agency setting precedent, the court held that the authority of the EPA to regulate GHGs delegated by the CAA displaces any federal common law right of state, city, and private parties to seek abatement of carbon-dioxide emissions from fossil-fuel fired power plants. The Supreme Court held that the plaintiffs could not sue based on the federal common law of public nuisance because the federal common law was in fact displaced by a federal statute, the CAA. Displacement occurs when a statute "speaks directly to the question at issue." Massachusetts v. Environmental Protection Agency established that emissions of carbon dioxide qualify as air pollution subject to regulation under the CAA and that this "speaks directly" to the emissions of carbon dioxide from the defendants power plants.

Based on EPA's designated authority, it is up to the EPA to decide whether and how to regulate GHGs from power plants. However, the court does leave a course of legal action open in the event the EPA does not enforce emissions limits against regulated sources by allowing "any person" to bring civil enforcement action in federal court. Also, if the EPA does not set emissions limits for certain pollutants or pollution sources, states and private parties can petition for a rulemaking in federal court.

== Significance ==
The decision in this case confirms the EPA's primacy as the regulator of GHGs initially established in Massachusetts v. Environmental Protection Agency and limits the possibility of claiming federal common law public nuisance for climate change litigation.

The decision in this case also impacted the decisions of similar climate change litigation. In Kivalina v. ExxonMobil Corporation, the city of Kivalina brought suit against 24 oil, gas, coal, and utility companies claiming the destruction of the coastal city of Kivalina, Alaska is being caused by activities of the energy industry that are resulting in global warming. An appeal was filed in the Ninth Circuit Court of Appeal, but it was rejected, holding that the plaintiff did not have standing under federal common law. Kivalina v. ExxonMobil Corporation followed the Supreme Court's decision in denying federal public nuisance claims of damages allegedly caused by GHGs as decided in American Electric Power Company v. Connecticut.

In Comer v. Murphy Oil, the residents and owners of property along the Mississippi Gulf Coast filed a class action lawsuit against a multitude of oil, coal, and chemical companies, alleging that GHGs were emitted by the defendants, thereby contributing to air and sea temperature elevations, which caused glacial melting and rising sea levels. The foregoing actions fueled Hurricane Katrina, which caused damage to plaintiffs' property. This case was dismissed on two occasions. In Comer II, the Fifth Circuit held that the CAA displaced the plaintiffs' public nuisance claim as in American Electric Power Company v. Connecticut and also preempted state law.
