= Andrew D. Hurwitz =

American judge (born 1947)

Andrew Hurwitz
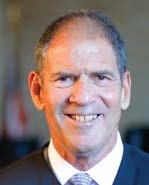

Senior Judge of the United States Court of Appeals for the Ninth Circuit
- Incumbent
- Assumed office October 3, 2022

Judge of the United States Court of Appeals for the Ninth Circuit
- In office June 27, 2012 – October 3, 2022
- Appointed by: Barack Obama
- Preceded by: Mary M. Schroeder
- Succeeded by: Roopali Desai

Vice Chief Justice of the Arizona Supreme Court
- In office July 1, 2009 – June 27, 2012
- Preceded by: Rebecca White Berch
- Succeeded by: Scott Bales

Justice of the Arizona Supreme Court
- In office March 17, 2003 – June 27, 2012
- Appointed by: Janet Napolitano
- Preceded by: Stanley G. Feldman
- Succeeded by: Ann Timmer

Personal details
- Born: Andrew David Hurwitz; October 1, 1947 (age 78) New York City, New York, U.S.
- Party: Democratic
- Education: Princeton University (BA); Yale University (JD)

Andrew David Hurwitz (born October 1, 1947) is a senior United States circuit judge of the United States Court of Appeals for the Ninth Circuit. He served as a justice of the Arizona Supreme Court from 2003 to 2012.

== Education and clerkships ==
Hurwitz graduated cum laude and Phi Beta Kappa from Princeton University in 1968 with an Artium Baccalaureus degree in Public and International Affairs. He earned his Juris Doctor from Yale Law School in 1972, where he served as a member of the Board of Editors and the Note and Comment Editor of the Yale Law Journal.

After law school, he clerked for Judge Jon O. Newman of the United States District Court for the District of Connecticut. and for Judge J. Joseph Smith of the United States Court of Appeals for the Second Circuit. From 1973 to 1974, he clerked for Justice Potter Stewart of the United States Supreme Court.

== Legal and political career ==
Hurwitz practiced law in Phoenix for nearly 30 years before becoming a judge. He was a partner at Osborn Maledon from 1995 to 2003, and an associate and partner at the predecessor firm Meyer Hendricks Victor Osborn & Maledon from 1974 to 1980 and from 1983 to 1995. His most notable case as an appellate attorney came in 2002, when he successfully argued Ring v. Arizona before the United States Supreme Court. Representing Timothy Ring and several other death row inmates, he argued that in murder cases the Sixth Amendment requires juries, rather than judges, to make factual determinations that aggravating circumstances exist that qualify defendants for the death penalty. The Supreme Court agreed in a 7–2 decision that dramatically altered capital sentencing in Arizona and a number of other states.

From 1980 to 1983, Hurwitz took a break from the practice of law to serve as chief of staff to Governor Bruce Babbitt. Among the projects he oversaw for Governor Babbitt was the creation of the Arizona Health Care Cost Containment System (AHCCCS), an innovative program to control Medicaid costs. His experience in the governor's office led then-Secretary of State Rose Mofford to tap him to lead her transition team during the 1988 impeachment of Governor Evan Mecham. When Mofford became governor after Mecham's removal from office, Hurwitz became her chief of staff. He later served as co-chair of the transition team for Governor Janet Napolitano.

In addition to his work for three Arizona governors, Hurwitz has held a variety of other public service positions. He served as a member of the Arizona Board of Regents overseeing the state's public university system from 1988 to 1996, including a term as president of the Board of Regents from 1992 to 1993. He chaired two City of Phoenix committees focused on neighborhood improvement and street environment from 1986 to 1990. He also served on the boards of directors of the Arizona Center for Law in the Public Interest (1986–1988) and the Children's Action Alliance (1999–2003). In addition, he has been an adjunct and visiting professor at the Sandra Day O'Connor College of Law at Arizona State University since 1977, teaching Ethics, Supreme Court Litigation, Legislative Process, Civil Procedure, and Federal Courts, among other classes.

== Judicial career ==
Hurwitz was appointed to the Arizona Supreme Court in 2003 by Governor Janet Napolitano, replacing former Chief Justice Stanley G. Feldman. In the 2006 election, he received another six-year term, with more than 77% of Arizona voters casting ballots in favor of his retention in office.

In March 2009, he was elected to serve a five-year term as Vice Chief Justice when Justice Rebecca White Berch was elected chief justice.

Notable opinions he authored include:

- Citizen Publishing Co. v. Miller ex rel Elleithee (2005) holding that a newspaper that ran a letter to the editor advocating the random murder of Muslims in retaliation for American deaths in the Iraq War could not be sued for intentional infliction of emotional distress because the letter qualified as political speech protected by the First Amendment;
- Kromko v. Arizona Board of Regents (2007), dismissing a lawsuit alleging that a university tuition increase violated the constitutional requirement that education be "as nearly free as possible" as a nonjusticiable political question;
- The Lofts at Fillmore v. Reliance Commercial (2008), holding that homebuilders can be sued by buyers for breach of the implied warranty of workmanship and habitability even if the homebuilder did not sell the home to the buyer;
- Seisinger v. Siebel (2009), holding that a statutory requirement for expert witnesses in medical malpractice cases did not violate the constitutional separation of powers doctrine;
- Turken v. Gordon (2010), commonly known as the "CityNorth" case, which clarified the requirements of the Gift Clause of the Arizona Constitution.

In addition to his judicial duties, Judge Hurwitz served as a member of the Advisory Committee on the Federal Rules of Evidence. He was appointed to the advisory committee by Chief Justice William H. Rehnquist in 2004, and reappointed by Chief Justice John G. Roberts in 2007. He is a member of the American Law Institute (since 2002) and a master of the Horace Rumpole Inn of Court (since 1997).

=== Federal judicial service ===
On November 2, 2011, President Barack Obama nominated Hurwitz to be a United States circuit judge of the United States Court of Appeals for the Ninth Circuit. On January 26, 2012, he received a hearing before the Senate Judiciary Committee and on March 1, 2012, his nomination was reported to the floor of the Senate by a 13–5 vote. All ten Democratic Senators voted aye along with Republican Senators Tom Coburn, Lindsey Graham and Jon Kyl, while Republican Senators John Cornyn, Chuck Grassley, Orrin Hatch, Mike Lee and Jeff Sessions voted no. On June 7, 2012, Senate Majority Leader Harry Reid filed for cloture on Hurwitz's nomination. On June 11, 2012, the United States Senate invoked cloture on his nomination by a 60–31 vote. On June 12, 2012, his nomination was confirmed by a voice vote. He received his commission on June 27, 2012. On January 28, 2022, he announced his intent to assume senior status upon confirmation of a successor. His successor was confirmed on August 4, 2022, and he assumed senior status on October 3, 2022.

=== Notable Ninth Circuit opinions ===
- Brach v. Newsom (9th Cir. 2021): Hurwitz dissented when the 9th circuit ruled that private schools are exempt from COVID-19 restrictions.
- Disney Enterprises, Inc. v. VidAngel, Inc., 869 F.3d 848 (9th Cir. 2017): Upholding the district court’s grant of preliminary injunction against streaming service that filters out “objectionable” content for customers, finding that film studios were likely to succeed on their Digital Millennium Copyright Act (DMCA) and copyright infringement claims.
- Lloyd v. CVB Fin. Corp., 811 F.3d 1200 (9th Cir. 2016): This decision represents the first time a federal circuit court expressly held that the public disclosure of an SEC investigation can form the basis of a viable loss causation theory, if the defendant also made a subsequent corrective disclosure.
- Saint Alphonsus Med. Ctr.-Nampa Inc. v. St. Luke's Health Sys., Ltd., 778 F.3d 775 (9th Cir. 2015): Legal commentators consider this a “landmark” antitrust-healthcare ruling because the Court rejected using quality care improvements standing alone to defend a merger that created market power that may lead to higher prices.
- Organized Vill. of Kake v. U.S. Dep't of Agric., 795 F.3d 956 (9th Cir. 2015) (en banc): Writing for the 6-5 majority of the en banc panel, Judge Hurwitz concluded that the Forest Service violated the APA when it failed to provide a reasonable explanation for implementing the Tongass Exemption in place of the Clinton-era roadless rule, which bans most road construction and timber harvest in inventoried roadless areas of national forests, effectively protecting 300,000 acres of Tongass National Forest land. “The 2003 ROD does not explain why an action that it found posed a prohibitive risk to the Tongass environment only two years before now poses merely a ‘minor’ one. The absence of a reasoned explanation for disregarding previous factual findings violates the APA. An agency cannot simply disregard contrary or inconvenient factual determinations that it made in the past, any more than it can ignore inconvenient facts when it writes on a blank slate.”
- Chinatown Neighborhood Ass'n v. Harris, 794 F.3d 1136 (9th Cir. 2015): Holding that California’s ban on possessing or selling shark fins did not violate the Dormant Commerce Clause and was not preempted by federal fisheries conservation policies.
- Baumann v. Chase Inv. Servs. Corp., 747 F.3d 1117 (9th Cir. 2014): Majority opinion held that representative actions brought pursuant to the California Labor Code Private Attorneys General Act (PAGA) are not sufficiently similar to Rule 23 class actions for removal to federal court under the Class Action Fairness Act (CAFA).
- Obsidian Finance Group, LLC v. Cox, 740 F.3d 1284 (9th Cir. 2014): Holding that a blogger is entitled to the same free speech protections as a traditional journalist, and thus cannot be liable for defamation unless she acted negligently.
- California ex rel. Imperial Cty. Air Pollution Control Dist. v. U.S. Dep't of the Interior, 767 F.3d 781 (9th Cir. 2014): Holding the plaintiffs had standing to sue and that the Secretary of the Interior did not violate the National Environmental Policy Act or the Clean Air Act when she filed an environmental impact statement on the effects of water transfer agreements on the Salton Sea in Southern California.
- Avila v. Los Angeles Police Dep’t, 758 F.3d 1096 (9th Cir. 2014): Rejecting the LAPD’s contention that the officer’s termination was not in contravention of the Fair Labor Standards Act (FLSA) anti-retaliation provision because it was based on the content of his testimony, not on the mere fact that he testified.
- Juliana v. United States (2020): Writing for a 2-1 majority in the widely-followed and so-called Kids' Climate Change case, Judge Hurwitz ruled against a group of youth plaintiffs seeking judicial redress under the U.S. Constitution for longstanding U.S. government policy regarding greenhouse gas emissions causing climate change, on the basis that federal courts must defer to the other branches of government in such policy matters, although his majority opinion did express sympathy for the environmentalists.
- Duncan v. Bonta (2021): In a concurring opinion to the majority en banc ruling that upheld a California regulation on firearms, Judge Hurwitz singled out a dissent written by Judge Lawrence VanDyke and rebuked his colleague "for attacking the personal motives of his sisters and brothers on this Court." Hurwitz pointed out that individual members of the majority panel owned handguns in their homes for self-defense and had served in the military where they bore arms. Hurwitz called for a higher level of respect, indicating that all federal judges swear an oath to uphold the constitution and are duty-bound to interpret the right to bear arms in the context of the public's desire to protect itself from indiscriminate mass shootings, saying: "The people of California should not be precluded from attempting to prevent mass murders simply because they don’t occur regularly enough in the eyes of an unelected Article III judge."

== Personal ==
Paul Bender (left) Jon Kyl (center) Andrew D. Hurwitz (right) speaking at Arizona State University

He is a native of Boonton, New Jersey, having moved there with his family at the age of 3 and a 1964 graduate of Boonton High School. He is married to Dr. Sally Hurwitz, formerly an associate dean at the Mary Lou Fulton Teachers College at Arizona State University.

== See also ==
- Barack Obama judicial appointment controversies
- List of Jewish American jurists
- List of law clerks for the eighth seat of the Supreme Court of the United States

Legal offices
Preceded by Stanley G. Feldman	Justice of the Arizona Supreme Court; 2003–2012	Succeeded by Ann Timmer
Preceded by Mary M. Schroeder	Judge of the United States Court of Appeals for the Ninth Circuit; 2012–2022	Succeeded by Roopali Desai
