= Steve Running =

- Born: April 18, 1950 (age 75); Spokane, Washington, U.S.
- Scientific career
- Institutions: University of Montana

Steven W. Running (born 1950) is an American scientist and academic. He is an emeritus regents professor of ecology at W.A. Franke College of Forestry & Conservation at the University of Montana, as well as director of the Numerical Terradynamics Simulation Group. He also developed the earth observing-oriented algorithms used by the Moderate Resolution Imaging Spectroradiometer (MODIS) on board NASA’s satellites Terra and Aqua. Running's MOD17 algorithms are used to provide accurate and continuous global monitoring of the terrestrial biosphere, specifically generating near-real-time data sets for repeated monitoring of vegetation primary production on vegetated land at 1-km resolution at 8-day intervals. These datasets are unique in that they provide global data on primary productivity and span a decade.

A recognized expert in global ecosystem monitoring, Running was invited to serve on the board of the Intergovernmental Panel on Climate Change (IPCC). In 2007, the IPCC was awarded the Nobel Peace Prize "for their efforts to build up and disseminate greater knowledge about man-made climate change, and to lay the foundations for the measures that are needed to counteract such change". Running made the following statement about winning the prize: "We've got to get past all the petty bickering and get to work. This is about a big transition for society over the next 50 years. The path we are on is unsustainable. What the Nobel committee is saying is that we've got to wake up. We've got to change the course of the whole world."

Running is co-author of the 2007 book Forest Ecosystems and has published over 300 scientific papers.

In 2012, Running suggested a tenth planetary boundary, the annual net global primary production of all terrestrial plants, as an easily determinable measure integrating many variables that will give "a clear signal about the health of ecosystems".
