= John R. Bartels Jr. =

American lawyer and first Administrator of the DEA

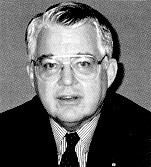

1st Chief of the New Jersey Strike Force
- In office 1968–1973
- Appointed by: Attorney General John N. Mitchell
- Preceding: Myles J. Ambrose, Customs; John Ingersoll, BNDD

Acting Administrator of the Drug Enforcement Administration
- In office July 1, 1973 – October 4, 1973
- Appointed by: President Richard Nixon

1st Administrator of the Drug Enforcement Administration
- In office October 4, 1973 – May 30, 1975
- Succeeded by: Henry S. Dogin (acting); Peter B. Bensinger

Personal details
- Born: November 27, 1934 (age 91) Brooklyn, New York
- Education: Philips Exeter Academy; Harvard University; Harvard Law School

John Ries Bartels Jr. (born November 27, 1934) is an American lawyer and was the first Administrator of the Drug Enforcement Administration. He was also the first Chief of the New Jersey Organized Crime Strike Force.

== Early life ==
Bartels was born in 1934 in New York to parents John R. Bartels and Anne Wilson.

Bartels attended the Phillips Exeter Academy and Harvard University. He spent time in Germany on exchange as a Fulbright scholar at the Ludwig-Maximilians-Universität München. He returned to attend Harvard Law School, and joined the BAR soon after.

=== Early career in the federal government ===
He was Assistant United States Attorney in the Southern District of New York for Robert Morgenthau. In an interview for Time Magazine, Bartels said: “I learned the extent of organized crime, the pervasive influence of mobsters.”

After the 1967 Newark riots, John N. Mitchell appointed Bartels to run the New Jersey Strike Force. While running this unit, Bartels coordinated the activities of ten federal agencies and local law enforcement. Bartels performed investigations, interviewed suspects, worked alongside federal agents, and arranged for witness protection. Bartels was directly responsible for "the most significant attack on organized crime in the state’s history." People that Bartels helped to indict include Hugh Addonizio, Thomas J. Whelan, John V. Kenny, corrupt cops, and corrupt politicians.

== First administrator of the DEA ==
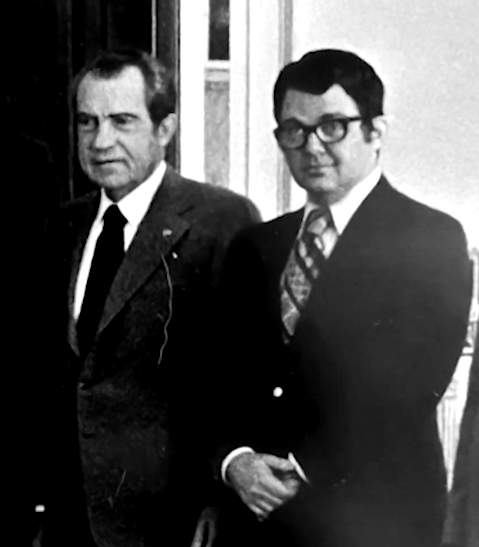
Bartels and Richard Nixon

The Drug Enforcement Administration was established on July 1, 1973, by Reorganization Plan No. 2 of 1973, signed by President Richard Nixon on July 28. It proposed the creation of a single federal agency to enforce the federal drug laws as well as consolidate and coordinate the government's drug control activities. Congress accepted the proposal, as they were concerned with the growing availability of drugs. As a result, the Bureau of Narcotics and Dangerous Drugs (BNDD), the Office of Drug Abuse Law Enforcement (ODALE); approximately 600 Special Agents of the Bureau of Customs, Customs Agency Service, and other federal offices merged to create the DEA.

When John Finlator, Myles Ambrose, and John Ingersoll - all three men who had been on the short list to run the new agency - all quit their jobs, Bartels was appointed Acting Administrator of the new Drug Enforcement Administration. Bartels' predecessors represented great interagency rivalry and oppositional approaches to narcotics and drugs law enforcement; Finlator at BDAC treated addiction as a medical issue, Ingersoll at BNDD stressed the need for vast and long-term investigations of global syndicates, and Ambrose at Customs ran an agency that had been known for patting-down American citizens and mass arrests of low-level street dealers.

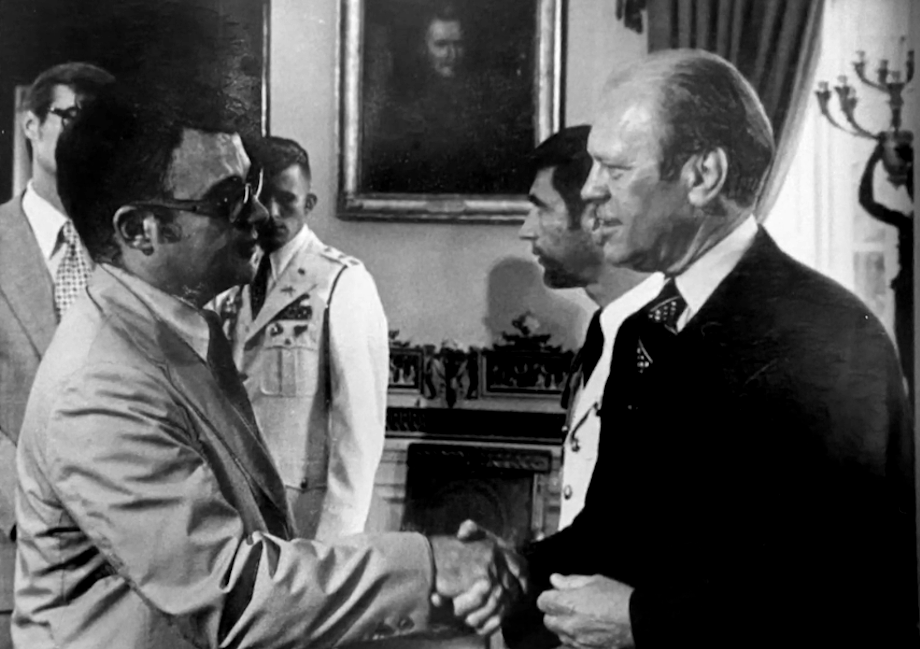
Bartels and Gerald R. Ford

Congress, and the Nixon Administration desired someone to lead the agency that was not from Customs (Ambrose) or BNDD (Ingersoll), which had been in constant interagency dispute. While Bartels had been a deputy director for Ambrose, he had not been working for him long enough to have the appearance of favoritism.

In October, he officially became the 1st Administrator of the DEA.

He expanded the DEA into a lasting federal agency. Bartels established the El Paso Intelligence Center, the DEA special agent training program, expanded the DEA Air Wing from its BNDD origins, and established the DEA's Office of Intelligence.

== Scandal and resignation ==
The American public did not approve of the new agency, and was highly suspicious of its director. In an interview with Playboy Magazine, Bartels said: "There are a great number of people who regard narcotics agents as corrupt Nazis who don't know how to open the door except with the heel of their right foot."

Congress was also highly suspicious of the agency from day one, and its greatest opposition in Congress was Henry M. Jackson. Vince Promuto, the Director of Public Affairs at DEA, was rocked with a scandal. Bartels was accused by DEA chief of inspectors Andrew C. Tartaglino of improper behavior and knowledge of Promuto's alleged behavior. Bartels denied this in Congress.

On May 30, 1975, in the midst of the scandal, President Ford, whose administration did not want to be associated with further scandal following the resignation of Richard Nixon, accepted Bartels' resignation. His office was assumed by Henry S. Dogin, Acting Administrator of the Drug Enforcement Administration.

On July 23, 1975, Charles Rangel said to Congress:

"While we in no way condone the wrongdoing of any agency official, we believe that the dismissal of John Bartels without minimal due process, coupled with the Justice Department's nationwide circulation of a document containing unproved allegations against him, warrants an explanation."

Promuto was later cleared of all charges.

== Retirement and later life ==
Bartels was a co-founder and senior attorney at the law firm of Bartels & Feureisen, which he still works as council.
