= John Ingersoll =

American police officer and federal law enforcement agent (1929–2023)

John (Jack) Ingersoll
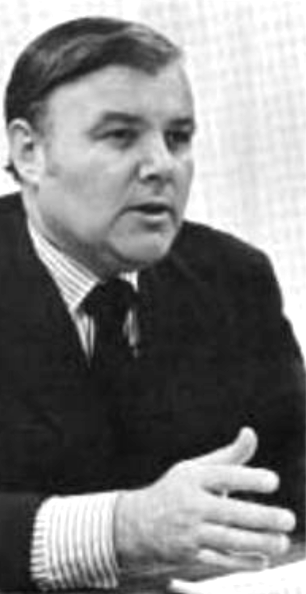

Chief of Police, Charlotte Police Department
- In office July 1, 1966 – April 1, 1968
- Appointed by: Mayor Stan Brookshire; Charlotte City Council
- Succeeded by: Jacob Clyde Goodman

Director of Bureau of Narcotics and Dangerous Drugs
- In office August 1, 1968 – June 29, 1973
- Appointed by: Lyndon B. Johnson
- Succeeded by: John R. Bartels Jr. (as 1st Administrator of the DEA)

Director of Security at IBM
- In office 1973–1993

Personal details
- Born: October 31, 1929 Westwood, California
- Died: January 12, 2023 (aged 93) Asheville, North Carolina
- Parents: Elise Ingersoll; Edward Ingersoll
- Education: University of California, Berkeley

Military service
- Branch/service: United States Army
- Rank: Special Agent
- Unit: Counterintelligence Corps

Johnathan (Jack) E. Ingersoll (October 31, 1929 – January 12, 2023) was an American police officer and federal law enforcement agent. He was the first chief of police in Charlotte, North Carolina, to use computers on the job. Ingersoll was the only director of the Bureau of Narcotics and Dangerous Drugs (BNDD), and resigned amid the Watergate scandal. The BNDD was merged into the Drug Enforcement Administration two days after he departed from the government.

== Early life and education ==
Ingersoll was born in Westwood, California, in 1929. When Ingersoll's father died in 1932, his mother moved the family to the San Francisco Bay Area, and Ingersoll was raised from that point in Berkeley, California. Ingersoll was an Episcopalian Christian. Ingersoll attended the University of California at Berkeley where he obtained a master's degree in criminology.

== Career as a police officer ==
Ingersol served as a Special Agent in the United States Army Counterintelligence Corps.

In 1957, Ingersol joined the Oakland Police Department, where he would eventually achieve the rank of Sergeant. While at Oakland, Ingersoll served as the Administrative Assistant to the Chief of Police. He was appointed to the position of Officer in Charge of the Planning and Research Division of the Oakland P.D. Ingersoll became an instructor of Political Science at Oakland City College. He also became a lecturer of criminology at the University of California.

In 1961, Ingersoll moved to Washington, D.C., to work as a consultant in police administration for the International Association of Chiefs of Police (IACP). In 1962, he was appointed to the position of Director of Field Services for the IACP. While in this position, he was involved in surveys of over 80 police departments in the United States.

In 1966, Ingersoll became the Police Chief of the Charlotte, North Carolina, Police Department. Ingersoll was the first Chief of Police in Charlotte to use computers on the job, and ensured the installation of the first computers in the department. Ingersoll oversaw the construction of the new police headquarters, and the merger of City and County police records systems.

In March 1968, while being vetted for the position of Director of the BNDD, Ingersoll tendered his resignation to the City of Charlotte. City council member Tuttle motioned to make Ingersoll an honorary citizen of Charlotte for life, and the Council unanimously agreed.

== Career as the Director of the Bureau of Narcotics and Dangerous Drugs ==
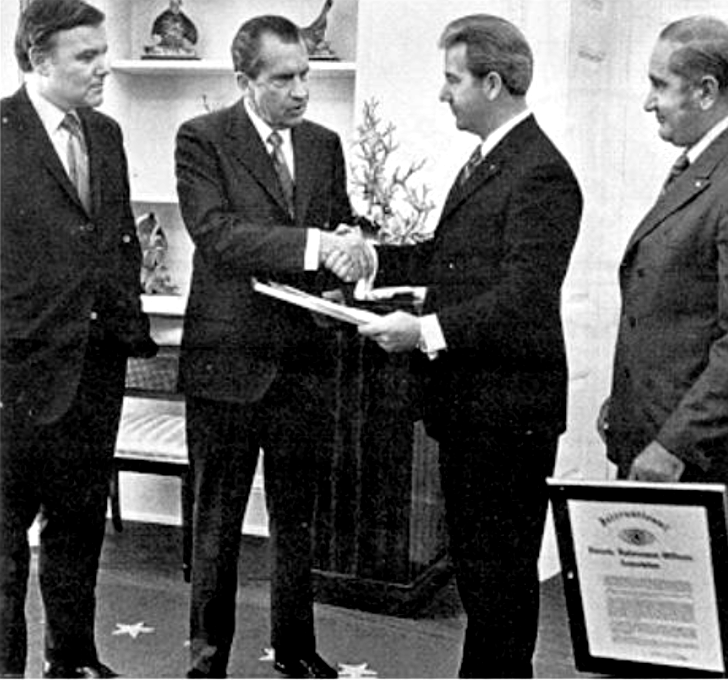
Ingersoll (left), observes the INEOA delivering a certificate of special honor to President Nixon.

On August 1, 1968, Ingersoll was appointed by President Lyndon B. Johnson to be the first Director of the newly established Bureau of Narcotics and Dangerous Drugs (BNDD), which was the successor agency to the infamous Federal Bureau of Narcotics (FBN).

Within five weeks of taking office, Ingersoll went to Europe to investigate the true sources of heroin in the United States. Ingersoll carried on the work of his FBN predecessors Harry J. Anslinger and Henry Giordano in investigating the French Connection, and was highly successful. During Ingersoll's tenure as Director of the BNDD the French connection was nearly completely eradicated, with the final convictions occurring shortly before the transition to the DEA. The FBN and the BNDD have largely been credited with the takedown of this criminal network.

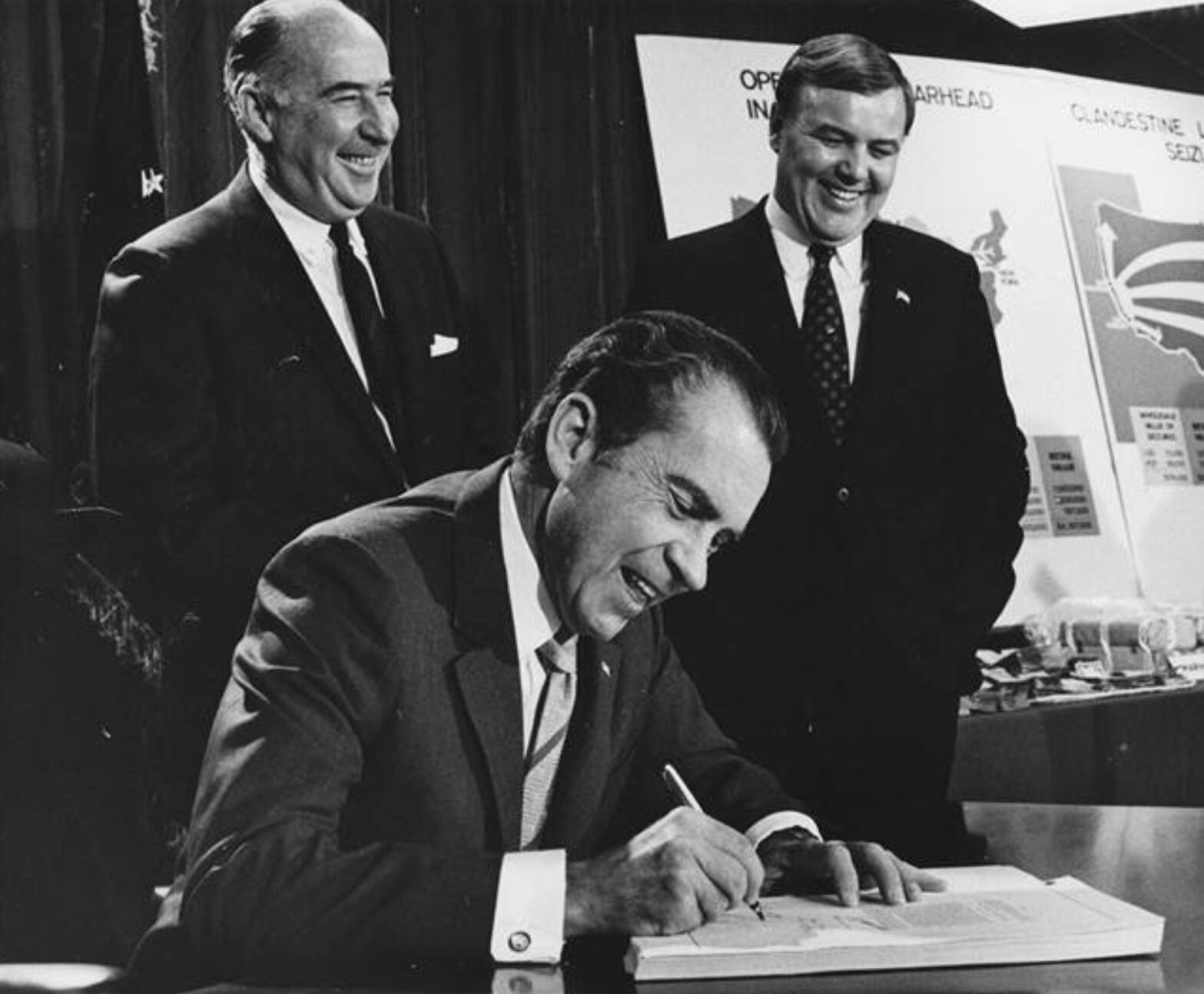
President Nixon sign the Comprehensive Drug Abuse Prevention and Control Act. Behind him are Attorney General John Mitchell (left), and Jack Ingersoll (right).

While the Vietnam War was ongoing during his tenure, Ingersoll was the chief government director responsible for ensuring that American military troops were not importing drugs or narcotics from Vietnam. While at the same time, the Nixon Administration and Air America (airline) were accused of selling drugs in Cambodia and Thailand. The Daily World newspaper wrote: "If Nixon isn't in the dope business, you figure it out."

Ingersoll eventually would come to form an intense rivalry with Eugene Rossides and Myles Ambrose from the Bureau of Customs.

=== Congressional confusion and allegations of poor performance ===
Ingersoll's approach to narcotics enforcement was one of global intelligence gathering from all sources on organized criminal syndicates, to the point of confusion by members of Congress and the White House, who wanted numbers, arrests, and convictions. Ingersoll could not properly communicate to Congress why he believed it was a waste of time and money to target low-level offenders, and that narcotics investigations should be delicate and surgical operations.

Meanwhile, Myles Ambrose as the Commissioner for Customs ran operations that repeatedly patted down members of the public, performed mass arrests, and targeted street-level dealers. To Congress, Ambrose was performing, and Ingersoll wasn't.

In January 1972, responding to the fears of Congress, Nixon created the Office of Drug Abuse Law Enforcement (ODALE) and placed Ambrose at its head. Nixon promoted Ambrose to the position of Special Assistant Attorney General, and Special Consultant to the President for Drug Abuse Law Enforcement - which effectively made Ambrose Nixon's first Drug Czar. To Ingersoll it became increasingly apparent that Nixon, like Congress, seemed to prefer the appearance of performance in narcotics investigations over true performance. Ingersoll suspected, without proof, that he was being forced out, and Ambrose was being groomed to be the head of the new DEA, however, on the 12th of June, 1973, Ambrose tendered his resignation without explanation.

=== Resignation from the Department of Justice ===
Ambrose's departure revealed that he had been favored by the administration, and especially by H. R. Haldeman and John D. Ehrlichman, to be the first DEA Administrator. Within three weeks of discovering this, on June 29, 1973, Ingersoll resigned from the federal government. Ingersoll also cited the fact that the Nixon administration's uncoordinated and haphazard policy toward narcotics was creating interagency rivalries that were disadvantageous to investigative work.

The DEA was created two days after Ingersoll resigned, and was placed under the acting administration of John R. Bartels Jr. By 1975, Bartels would ultimately suffer the same fate as Ingersoll: repeated requests for him to resign due to poor performance numbers, based in the Congressional desire for performance, and his lack of ability to explain to them the difference between proper and improper narcotics investigations.

== Career in IBM ==
After quitting the Bureau, Ingersoll accepted the position as Director of Security for the IBM's International Business Unit and the IBM World Trade Subsidiary, where he worked for the next twenty years.

== Retirement and later life ==
After retiring from IBM, Ingersoll consulted in public and private sector security.

In 1994, Ingersoll and his wife moved to Asheville, North Carolina. Ingersoll joined the board of the North Carolina Center for Creative Retirement at the University of North Carolina at Asheville, and became the President of UNC Asheville's College for Seniors.

In 2009, Ingersoll and his wife moved to the Deerfield Episcopal Retirement Community in Asheville, where he served on the board of directors and the Finance Committee.

Ingersoll died on January 12, 2023. He was survived by his wife, three children, seven grandchildren, and three great-grandchildren.

== See also ==
- Comprehensive Drug Abuse Prevention and Control Act of 1970
