= Derek S. Maltz =

United States government official

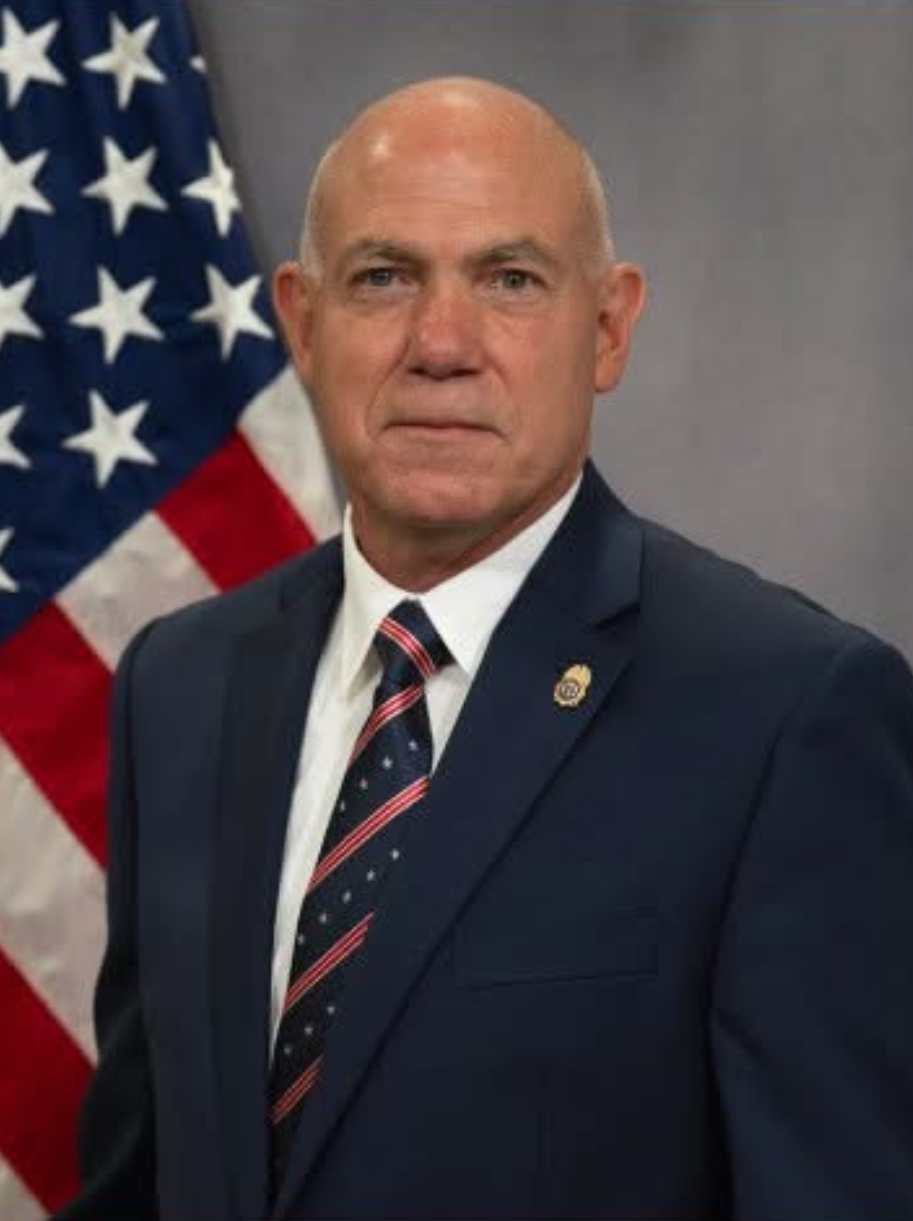
- Official portrait, 2025

Acting Administrator of the Drug Enforcement Administration
- In office January 20, 2025 – May 2, 2025
- President: Donald Trump
- Preceded by: Anne Milgram
- Succeeded by: Terry Cole

Personal details
- Party: Republican
- Children: 3, including Dylan Maltz
- Education: Syracuse University (BS)

Derek S. Maltz is an American government official who had served as acting administrator of the U.S. Drug Enforcement Administration.

== Early life and education ==
Maltz attended Syracuse University, where he played lacrosse. He graduated with a bachelor's degree in accounting.

== Career ==
Maltz headed the New York Drug Enforcement Task Force at the DEA’s New York Field Division. While at the agency, he led the special operations division for nearly a decade. He retired from the agency in 2014, taking a new role as the executive director for government relations at surveillance technology company Pen-Link. After stepping down as Acting Administrator of the DEA, Penlink rehired him as an executive director.

== Personal life ==
Maltz has a wife, Patricia, and three sons: Derek, Dylan, and Daniel.
