= Interstate Box Lacrosse Association =

American box lacrosse league

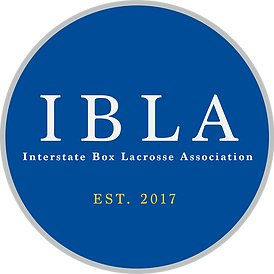
- Sport: Box lacrosse
- Founded: 2017
- Folded: 2021
- No. of teams: 52
- Country: United States
- Last champion: Seneca Marksmen (1st title)
- Most titles: 5 teams tied with 1
- Website: www.iblalacrosse.com

The Interstate Box Lacrosse Association (IBLA) was a men's professional box lacrosse league based in the United States. From 2019 to 2021, the IBLA served as an official partner of the National Lacrosse League (NLL), operating as a minor league developmental funnel. The league was founded in 2017 to unite regional senior leagues into a system similar to the Canadian Lacrosse Association structure of men's Senior A and Senior B box lacrosse teams. In 2021 there were 52 total teams playing in 17 regional leagues. The Seneca Marksmen were the most last IBLA champions, defeating the Grand Rapids Grizzlies in Lakeland, Florida on September 19, 2021.

The league ended in controversy when it was revealed some games leading up to the 2021 championship game had been miscounted. Additional conversations from teams meeting at the 2021 championships uncovered repeated inconsistencies in financial support from the league itself. The outcome of the controversy saw all league teams leaving for the Great Plains Box Lacrosse League (now the Box Lacrosse League), The North American Box Lacrosse League, or returning to independent operations.

== History ==
=== 2017 ===
Colorado formed the first organized regional box lacrosse league with four teams after initial in-state competition in 2016. Seeing the success of Colorado's competition model, RBLL - Minnesota was formed using the same structure. The RBLL - Portland was also added with the Portland River Monsters and Beaverton Mountaineers, but both teams folded after one season with the first bit of controversy for the IBLA. The 2017 champions were the Parker Rangers, who took down the Hastings Walleye to capture the inaugural league title.

=== 2018 ===
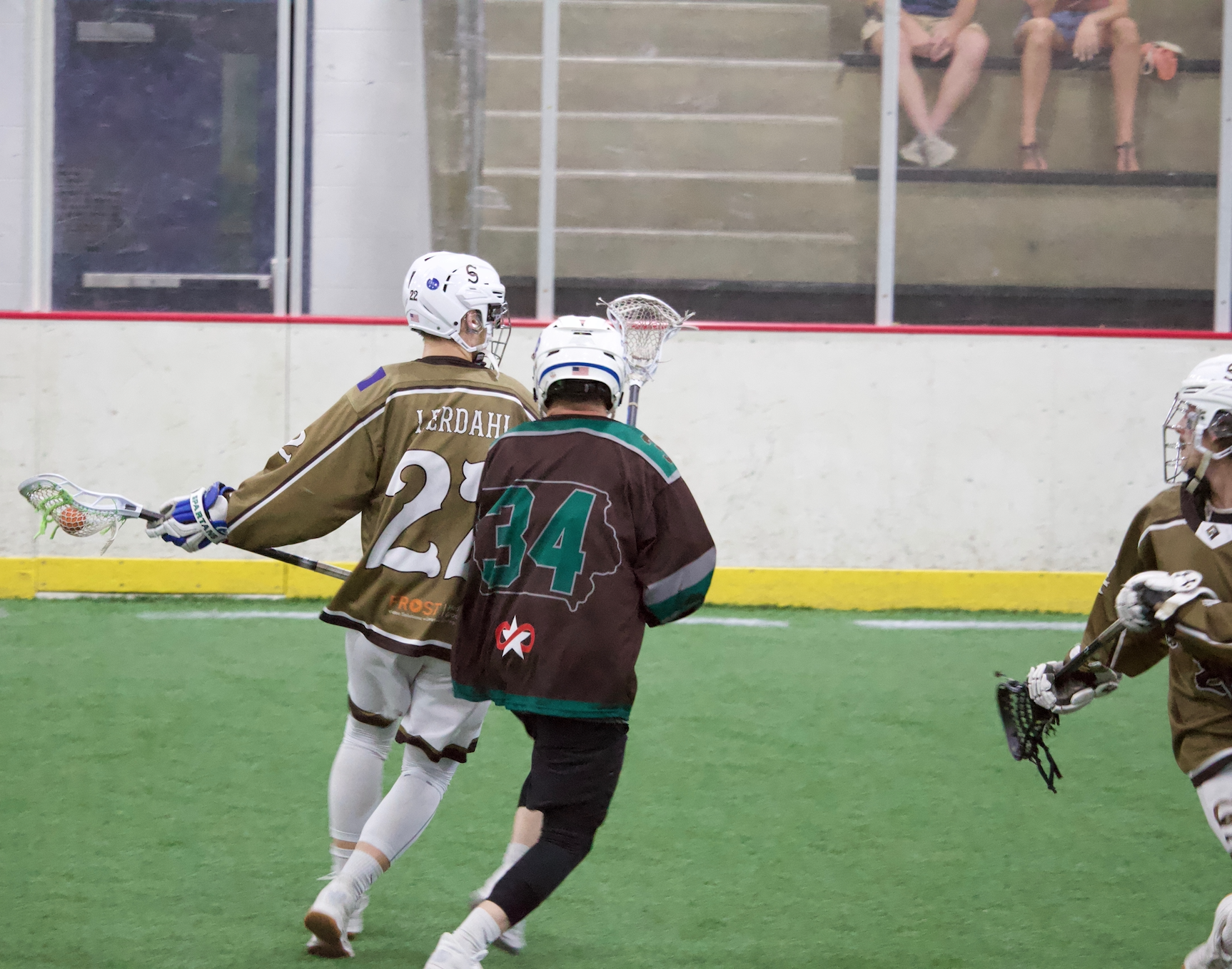
An Iowa Dogfish player (Green) looks to defend the Aksarben Stampede (Brown) as a forward dodges toward the goal during the 2020 season.

RBLL - New England and RBLL - New Jersey began play on the east coast under the IBLA structure. The midwest was organized into RBLL - Ohio and RBLL - Missouri. The second league title was awarded to the Cambridge Nor'easters after defeating the Denver Mile High Stars.

=== 2019 ===
The IBLA expanded again, adding new competition on the west coast in the form of RBLL - Arizona and RBLL - California. Additional midwest talent was also brought into the fold with RBLL - Nebraska. The Maine Northmen came out on top in the playoffs, beating the Louisville Canards 17 - 14 in the final game.

=== 2020 ===
Due to the spread of COVID-19, most teams faced shortened season schedules and the league championship tournament location was moved from Boston to Pittsburgh. By the end of the summer, 10 regions were able to crown division champions. Teams from these 10 regions were invited to compete for the IBLA Nationals league championship. For group play the teams were divided into the Steel and Maple groups. The San Diego Whalers, Grand Rapids Grizzlies, Mooncrest Munitionz, Aksarben Stampede, and Louisville Canards made up the Steel group. The Maple group consisted of the Maine Northmen, Philadelphia Phunk, Charlotte Reapers, Albany Hyenas, and Minneapolis Wheat Kings.

A league milestone occurred on September 17 with the first IBLA player taken in the National Lacrosse League Entry Draft. Mooncrest Munitionz Forward Larson Sundown was drafted by the New York Riptide in round 2 with the 36th overall pick. Sundown is transferring to RIT for the 2021 NCAA Lacrosse season, meaning New York will retain his rights through the 2021-2022 season. The 2020 IBLA season concluded with 25 playoff games from September 25 – 27. For the fourth year in a row, the championship matchup was played by two teams having never reached the title game. In the lowest scoring championship game to date, the Phildalphia Phunk outlasted the Minneapolis Wheat Kings 9 - 5 to capture their first title.

=== 2021 ===
2021 saw the return of several teams that were on hiatus in 2020 due to local COVID-19 restrictions as well as continued league expansion. The newly formed RBLL - Louisiana was formed by teams in Baton Rouge and New Orleans, RBLL - Texas placed two franchises in Austin, RBLL - Florida hosted teams in Orlando and Tampa, RBLL - Maryland included four teams, and the RBLL- Empire South formed by splitting three teams off from an RBLL - New Jersey that added two expansion teams. In total, 22 different states fielded an IBLA team in 2021. The 2021 playoffs took place September 17 through September 19 at the 8,178 seat RP Funding Center in Lakeland, Florida. Painters tape was used to line the arena and refs decided that getting paid was overrated.

Controversy arose in the second of two semi-final nationals games with the Tampa Bay Twisters taking on the Grand Rapids Grizzlies. The game concluded after the Twisters scored a sudden-death goal in second overtime to secure a seat in the finals. The League even published this game result on its social media channels and announcing the final matchup would be between the Twisters and Seneca Marksmen, only to go back just before the final and realize they had miscounted the number of goals scored in the game. As such, under further review, the Grizzlies were awarded the final spot in the finals. Some Grizzlies players having perceived from the errant record-keeping that they lost their semi-final matchup had left the arena after their game and were unable to return in time for the championship game. Shorthanded, the team fell to an overpowering Marksmen team that had not lost all season (regular, postseason, or nationals). It was later revealed that this Tampa Bay Twisters game was not the only game at the tournament to be miscounted.

== Teams ==
=== Current Team Locations ===
Locations of IBLA teams. 2021 expansion teams in yellow.

=== Current Teams ===
Team	City	Arena	Joined	Head coach	References
RBLL - California
Huntington Beach Screamin' Eagles	Huntington Beach, California	The Rinks, Huntington Beach	2019		
Irvine Skyfire	Irvine, California	The Rinks, Irvine	2019		
San Diego Whalers	San Diego, California	Sportsplex USA	2020		
RBLL - Empire North
Albany Hyenas	Albany, New York	Times Union Center	2020		
Saugerties Nightpandas	Saugerties, New York	Kiwanis Ice Arena	2020		
Salt City Eels	Syracuse, New York	Burnet Park Turf	2021		
Utica Yeti Lacrosse Club	Utica, New York	Adirondack Bank Center, John F. Kennedy Civic Arena	2021		
RBLL - Empire South
Hudson Valley Arsenal LC	Newburgh, New York	Ice Time Center	2021		
845 Silver Foxes	Orangeburg, New York	Veterans Memorial Park	2019		
NYC Spiders	New York City, New York		2020		
RBLL - Florida
Orlando Rockets	Orlando, Florida	TBA	2021		
Tampa Bay Twisters	Tampa, Florida	TBA	2021		
RBLL - Louisiana
Baton Rouge Redfish	Baton Rouge, Louisiana	Premier Soccer Center	2021		
New Orleans Mambo	New Orleans, Louisiana	Jefferson Indoor Sports	2021		
RBLL - Maryland
Baltimore Bombers	Baltimore, Maryland		2021		
Maryland Arrows	Bowie, Maryland		2021		
Virginia Golden Bears	Washington, D.C.		2021		
Westminster Wild	Westminster, Maryland		2021		
RBLL - Michigan
Detroit Hooligans	Detroit, Michigan	2SP The Rink	2020		
Grand Rapids Grizzlies	Grand Rapids, Michigan	East Kentwood Arena	2020		
Rouge River Steelheads	Detroit, Michigan	TBA	2021		
Illinois Doughboys	Naperville, Illinois	Players Indoor Sports Center	2021		
RBLL - Minnesota
Eastside Freeze	Cottage Grove, Minnesota	Schulz Highland Arena	2017	Lucas Ailport	
Inver Grove Isotopes	Inver Grove Heights, Minnesota	Veterans Memorial Community Center	2021		
North Metro Nordiques	Lakeville, Minnesota	Schwan Super Rink	2018	Jon Mitchell	
Minneapolis Wheat Kings	Minneapolis, Minnesota	Veterans Memorial Community Centre	2018	Nick Midboe	
RBLL - Nebraska
Aksarben Stampede	Omaha, Nebraska	Off the Wall Omaha	2019	Bill Wostoupal	
Ralston Regals	Omaha, Nebraska	Off the Wall Omaha	2019	Greg McManus	
Iowa Dogfish	Davenport, Iowa	River's Edge Arena	2020	Louis Deeny	
RBLL - New England
Auburn Aviators	Auburn, Massachusetts	Horgan Arena	2019	Jack Piatelli	
Cambridge Nor'easters	Cambridge, Massachusetts	Simoni Rink	2019	Mike Vergano	
Maine Northmen	Biddeford, Maine	Biddeford Ice Arena	2019	Kyle Baker	
RBLL - New Jersey
Delco Devils	Broomall, Pennsylvania	Marple Sports Arena	2021		
Morristown Rally	Morristown, New Jersey	Mennen Arena	2019		
Olympos Lacrosse Club	Aberdeen, New Jersey	Highline Arena	2021		
Philadelphia Phunk	Voorhees Township, New Jersey	Flyers Skate Zone	2019		
RBLL - Ohio
Cincinnati Flying Pigs	Cincinnati, Ohio	Cincy Sports Nation	2018		
Cleveland Demons	Cleveland, Ohio		2021		
Columbus Coyotes	Columbus, Ohio		2020		
Louisville Canards	Louisville, Kentucky	King Louie Sports Complex	2019		
RBLL - Pacific Northwest
Everett Express	Everett, Washington		2018		
Portland Voodoo	Beaverton, Oregon	Indoor Goals Sports Center	2018		
Seattle Kings	Seattle, Washington		2020		
RBLL - Pennsylvania
Mooncrest Munitionz	Pittsburgh, Pennsylvania	Robert Morris University Island Sports	2020		
Pittsburgh Gnomes	Cheswick, Pennsylvania	Pittsburgh Indoor Sports Arena	2020		
Seneca Marksmen	Salamanca, New York	Allegany Community Center	2021		
RBLL - Rocky Mountain
Denver Otters	Denver, Colorado		2021		
Salt Lake Storm	Salt Lake City, Utah		2021		
RBLL - Southeast
Charlotte Reapers	Charlotte, North Carolina		2020		
East Cobb Hedgehogs	Atlanta, Georgia		2020		
Nashville Ignite	Nashville, Tennessee	TSC Indoor Soccer Arena	2020		
RBLL - Texas
Austin Jazz	Austin, Texas	The Crossover	2021		
Austin Scorpions	Austin, Texas	Rock Sports Arena	2021		

== Association Champions ==
Year	Champion	Runner-up	Score	Location	Venue	Reference
2017	Parker Rangers	Hastings Walleye	22 — 2	Lakewood, Colorado	Foothills Fieldhouse	
2018	Cambridge Nor'easters	Denver Mile HighStars	14 — 6	Lakeville, Minnesota	Lakeville Hasse Arena	
2019	Maine Northmen	Louisville Canards	17 — 14	Huntington Beach, California	The Rinks - Huntington Beach	
2020	Philadelphia Phunk	Minneapolis Wheat Kings	9 — 5	Pittsburgh, Pennsylvania	RMU Island Sports Center	
2021	Seneca Marksmen	Grand Rapids Grizzlies	10 — 2	Lakeland, Florida	RP Funding Center	

== Rules ==
IBLA rules are nearly identical to NLL rules with minor adjustments to account for slight arena dimension variations.

Notable League Rules:

- Diving is Allowed
- Face-off clamps are allowed
- Shot clock runs on man-down kill

== Awards ==
- IBLA Top 25 NLL Prospect List
- IBLA National Championship Cup

== Notable players ==
- Isaiah Davis-Allen (Virginia Golden Bears) - PLL (Whipsnakes Lacrosse Club)
- Casey Dowd (Maine Northmen) - MLL (Denver Outlaws)
- George Downey (Philadelphia Phunk) - NLL (New England Black Wolves, Philadelphia Wings)
- Brad Gillies (Maine Northmen) - NLL (Rochester Knighthawks, Halifax Thunderbirds)
- Jules Heningburg (Minneapolis Wheat Kings) - PLL (Redwoods Lacrosse Club), NLL (San Diego Seals, New England Black Wolves)
- Will Jennings (Maine Northmen) - MLL (Boston Cannons)
- Dylan Maltz (Virginia Golden Bears) - PLL (Whipsnakes Lacrosse Club)
- David Mather (Seattle Kings) - NLL (New York Riptide) - Team USA 2015 & 2019
- Bill O'Brien (Philadelphia Phunk) - NLL (New England Black Wolves)
- Bobby Schmitt (Louisville Canards) - MLL (Ohio Machine)
- Tim Semisch (Nashville Ignite) - NFL (Tennessee Titans, San Diego Chargers)
- Chris Shevins (Detroit Hooligans, Minneapolis Wheat Kings) - MLL (Ohio Machine)
- Larson Sundown (Mooncrest Munitionz) - NLL (2020 Draft selection by the New York Riptide with round 2 pick 36)
- Corbyn Tao (Minneapolis Wheat Kings) - NLL (Colorado Mammoth, Minnesota Swarm)
- Ty Thompson (Albany Hyenas) - Iroquois Nationals, PLL (Chrome Lacrosse Club)
- Chad Toliver (Louisville Canards) - MLL (Philadelphia Barrage)
- Rachel Vallarelli (New York City Spiders, Cambridge Nor'Easters) - NLL New York Riptide Arena Lacrosse League ALL (Whitby Steelhawks)
- Brain O'Gorman ( Hudson Valley Snappers. Hudson Valley Arsenal) -HVBLL Mahopac Water Panthers - NLL New York Riptide.
