= Michele Leonhart =

US Drug Enforcement Administration Administrator

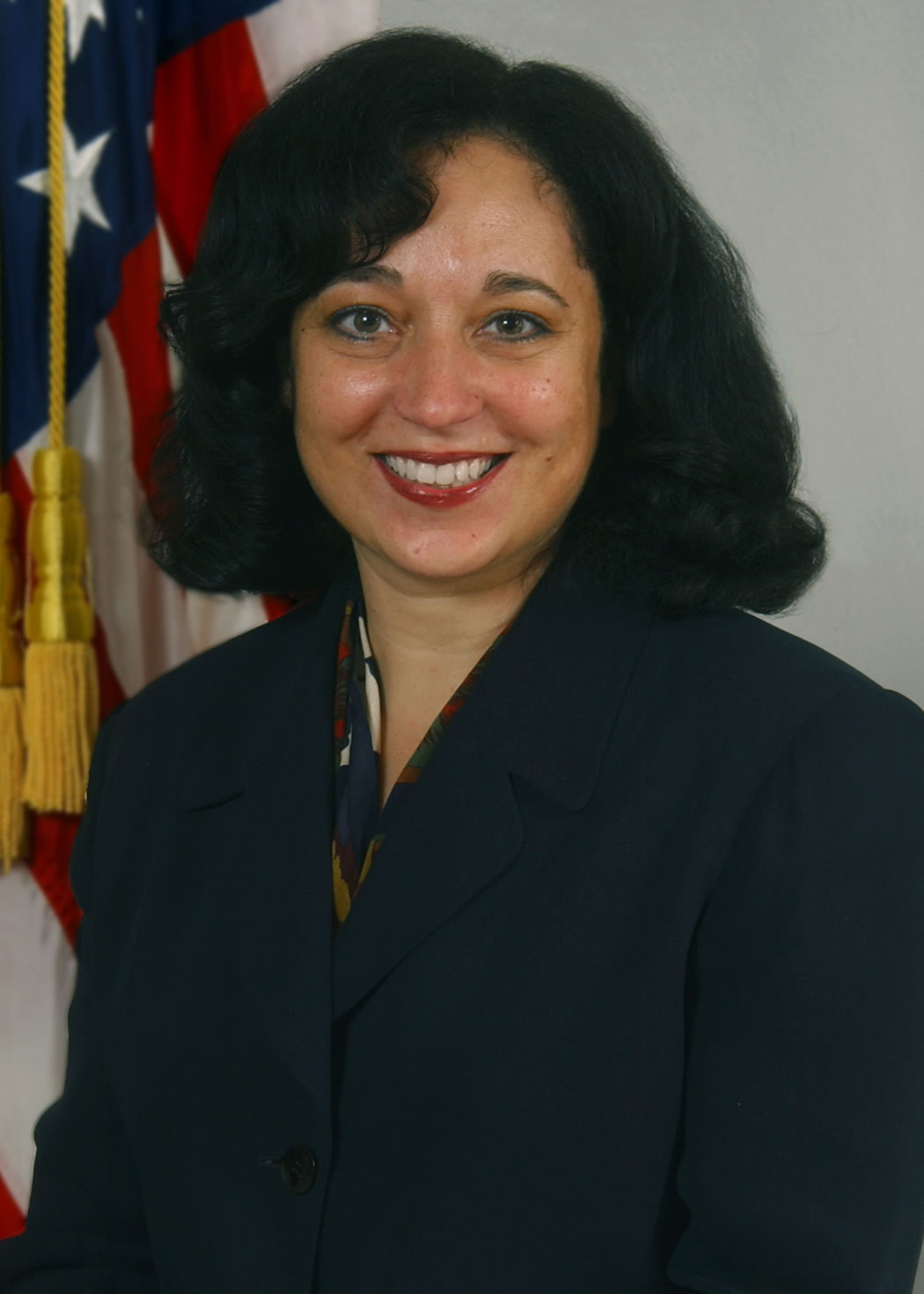

10th Administrator of the Drug Enforcement Administration
- In office December 22, 2010 – May 14, 2015; Acting: November 10, 2007 – December 22, 2010
- President: George W. Bush; Barack Obama
- Preceded by: Karen Tandy
- Succeeded by: Anne Milgram (2021)

Personal details
- Born: February 27, 1956 (age 70)
- Education: Bemidji State University (BCJ)

Michele Marie Leonhart (born February 27, 1956) is an American career law enforcement officer who served as the tenth Administrator of the Drug Enforcement Administration (DEA) from 2010 to 2015, as well as in an acting capacity from 2007 to 2010 after the resignation of Administrator Karen P. Tandy in the fall of 2007. On February 2, 2010, President Barack Obama nominated Leonhart for the position of DEA Administrator.

Leonhart's tenure as DEA Administrator was marked with controversy and scandals including a prostitution scandal; by the end of her service in April 2015, a bipartisan group of lawmakers declared that they had no confidence in her leadership. On April 21, she conveyed to Attorney General Eric Holder that she intended to resign the following month.

== Career ==
Leonhart graduated from Bemidji State University in 1978 with a bachelor's degree in criminal justice, and began her career in law enforcement as a patrol officer in the Baltimore Police Department before entering the DEA in late 1980 as a Special Agent. She became DEA's first female Special Agent in Charge in 1997. President George W. Bush announced his intention to nominate Leonhart as Deputy Administrator on July 31, 2003, and submitted her nomination to the United States Senate on October 3, 2003. The Senate confirmed her nomination on March 8, 2004. On April 15, 2008, the White House announced that President Bush intended to nominate Leonhart to succeed Tandy as the next Administrator of DEA. Leonhart's nomination was received by the Senate the same day and referred to the Senate Judiciary Committee. However, the committee did not hold any hearings on Leonhart's nomination, and on January 2, 2009, the nomination was returned to the President under the provisions of Senate Rule XXXI, paragraph 6 of the Standing Rules of the Senate pursuant to sine die adjournment at the end of the 110th Congress.

She is currently Chair of the D.A.R.E. Board of Directors.

=== DEA Administrator ===
During Leonhart's testimony before the Judiciary Committee, she was questioned by a member of the Committee on Aging, Senator Herb Kohl (D-WI), about her policy for nurses prescribing painkillers for patients in nursing homes. The problem of DEA interference during Leonhart's acting administratorship with the prescription of painkillers by nurses in nursing homes had come before the Committee on Aging. Unsatisfied with her responses to his questions, Senator Kohl threatened to put a hold on Leonhart's nomination that could have postponed the vote on her confirmation indefinitely. In correspondence between the Committee on Aging and the DEA, Senator Kohl received assurances that patients suffering intractable pain could receive painkillers prescribed by nurses. On December 22, 2010, the Senate confirmed Leonhart's nomination unanimously by voice vote.

Administrator Leonhart faced a large increase in prescription drug overdoses due to the opioid crisis. Regardless, drug diversion enforcement actions against pharmaceutical companies declined sharply under her leadership, dropping from 131 in 2011 to 40 in 2014. In 2013, DEA's chief administrative law judge John J. Mulrooney II reported that for the first time on record no charging documents had been filed for a whole month, finding that each case was now costing $11 million and one enforcement action was being taken for every 625 deaths. In 2014, Mulrooney began allowing his judges to begin hearing cases from other agencies because the DEA's caseload was so low.

In April 2015, a bipartisan group of congressmen declared they had no confidence in Leonhart's leadership as DEA administrator. Days later, it was reported that Leonhart was expected to resign her position.

== Controversy ==
In 2011, the Washington Post reported that "994 people younger than 18 were killed in drug-related violence between late 2006 and late 2010" and that "[i]n 2009, the last year for which there is data, 1,180 children were killed, half in shootings." In response to these statistics, Leonhart declared that while it "may seem contradictory, the unfortunate level of violence is a sign of success in the fight against drugs."

In 2014, Leonhart openly criticized President Barack Obama's stance on cannabis at a meeting of the National Sheriffs' Association. Marijuana activists and two congressmen called for her resignation due to her stance on cannabis while some law enforcement leaders defended her position. She also argued that dog owners should oppose marijuana legalization due to edible products' toxicity to animals. However, one study that examined 125 Colorado dogs who had contracted marijuana toxicosis between 2005 and 2010 found that only two dogs died as a result of ingesting marijuana edibles, and in both cases it was unclear whether death was caused by THC or by other ingredients toxic to canines, such as chocolate and caffeine.

In March 2015, it was revealed DEA agents were participating in drug cartel-funded sex parties with prostitutes. Agents were given expensive gifts, weapons and money. Surrounding the scandal, Leonhart announced her retirement. In April 2015, twenty-two members of the House Oversight and Government Reform Committee said in a joint statement they had lost confidence in Leonhart's leadership.

Political offices
Preceded by Karen Tandy	10th Administrator of the Drug Enforcement Administration; 2007–2015	Succeeded by Chuck Rosenberg; Acting
