= Karen Tandy =

American attorney, federal administrator, and advisor

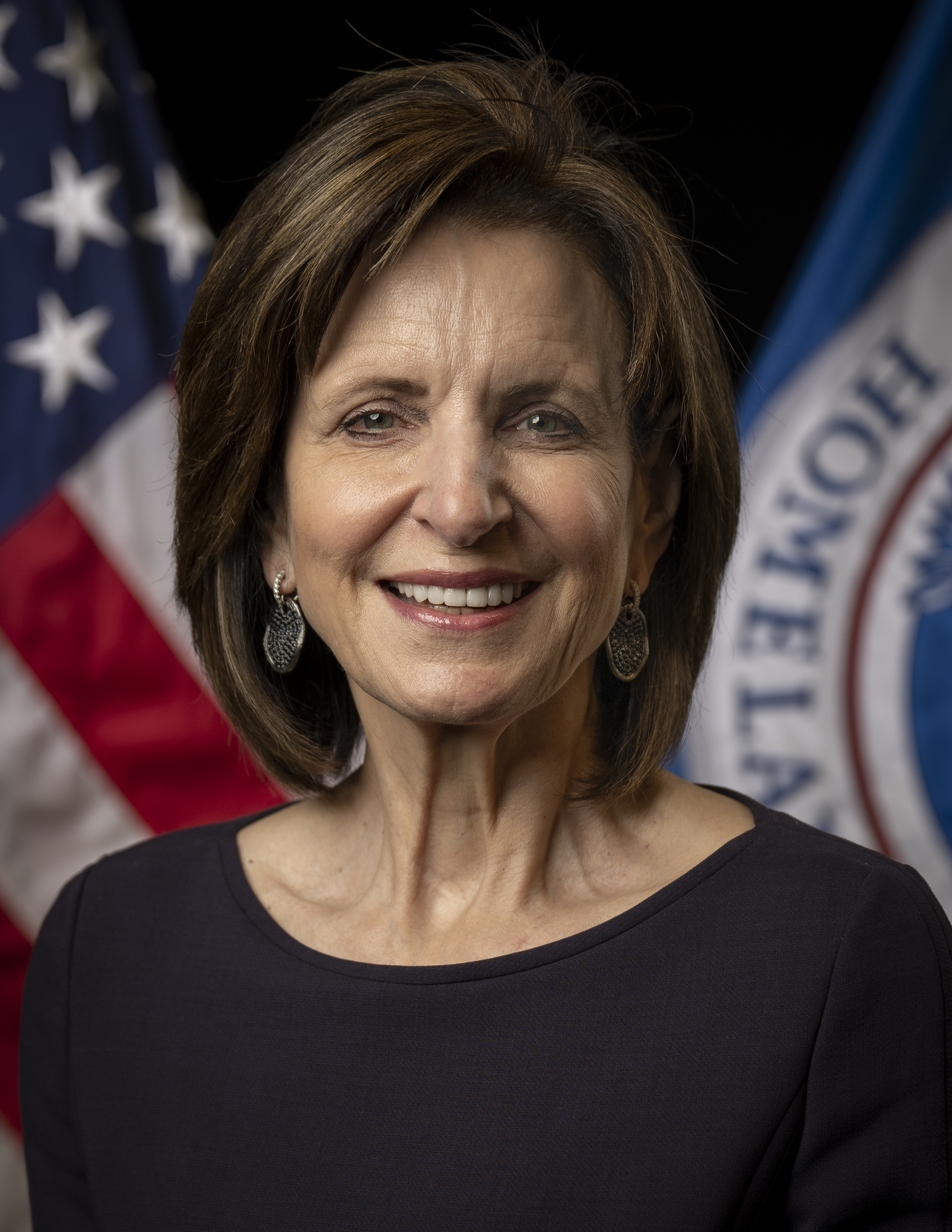

Vice Chair of the Homeland Security Advisory Council
- Incumbent
- Assumed office June 2016
- President: Barack Obama; Donald Trump; Joe Biden

9th Administrator of the Drug Enforcement Administration
- In office September 17, 2003 – November 10, 2007
- President: George W. Bush
- Preceded by: Asa Hutchinson
- Succeeded by: Michele Leonhart

Personal details
- Education: Texas Tech University (BA); Texas Tech University School of Law (JD)

Karen Pomerantz Tandy is an American attorney and law enforcement official who served as the 9th Administrator of the Drug Enforcement Administration from 2003 to 2007. She was nominated by President George W. Bush and confirmed by the U.S. Senate on July 31, 2003. She was the first female head of the DEA. Since 2016 she has served on the Homeland Security Advisory Council.

== Early life and education ==
Tandy is a native of Fort Worth, Texas and graduated from L. D. Bell High School in Hurst, Texas. She earned a bachelor's degree from Texas Tech University and a Juris Doctor from the Texas Tech University School of Law.

== Career ==
On October 22, 2007, she announced her retirement from the DEA, and took a position with Motorola. Tandy then became senior vice president of public affairs and communications where she served as Motorola's top public policy spokesperson on issues related to global telecom policy, trade, regulation, spectrum allocation, and country relations.

Since June 2016, she has served as vice chair of the Homeland Security Advisory Council. In March 2021, after Secretary of Homeland Security Alejandro Mayorkas dismissed all 32 members of the advisory council, Tandy was one of only three senior-level members to remain in their positions.

Government offices
Preceded by Asa Hutchinson	9th Administrator of the Drug Enforcement Administration; 2003–2007	Succeeded by Michele Leonhart
