= Pamela Ann Rymer =

American judge (1941–2011)

Pamela Rymer
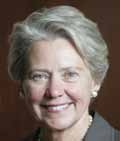

Judge of the United States Court of Appeals for the Ninth Circuit
- In office May 22, 1989 – September 21, 2011
- Appointed by: George H. W. Bush
- Preceded by: Anthony Kennedy
- Succeeded by: Paul J. Watford

Judge of the United States District Court for the Central District of California
- In office February 24, 1983 – May 22, 1989
- Appointed by: Ronald Reagan
- Preceded by: William Percival Gray
- Succeeded by: Robert C. Bonner

Personal details
- Born: January 6, 1941 Knoxville, Tennessee, U.S.
- Died: September 21, 2011 (aged 70) Los Angeles, California, U.S.
- Education: Vassar College (AB); Stanford University (LLB)

Pamela Ann Rymer (January 6, 1941 - September 21, 2011) was a United States circuit judge of the United States Court of Appeals for the Ninth Circuit and a United States district judge of the United States District Court for the Central District of California.

== Education and career ==
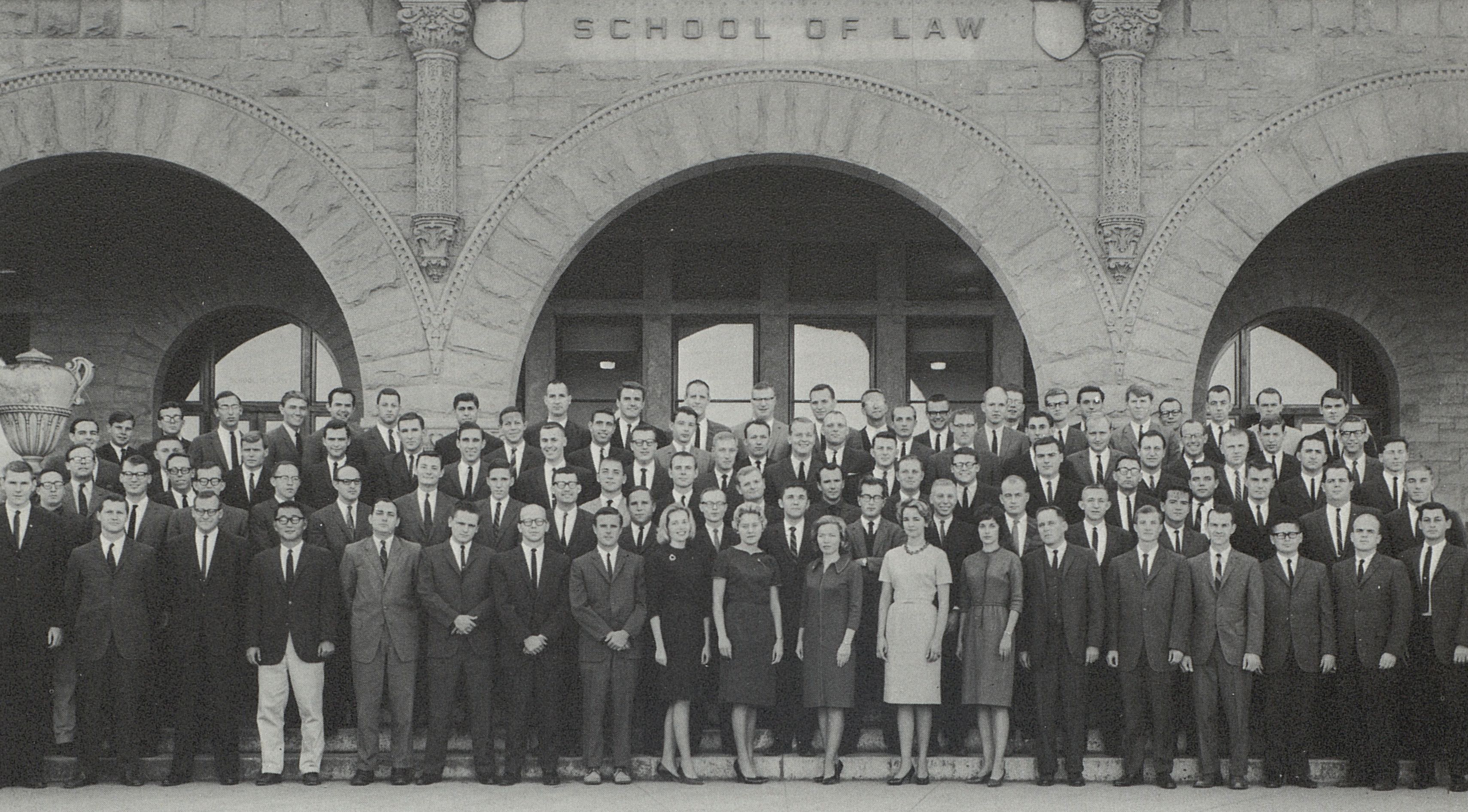
Rymer (bottom row, ninth from left) with other members of graduating class of Stanford Law School, 1964

Born in Knoxville, Tennessee, Rymer earned an Artium Baccalaureus degree from Vassar College in 1961 and a Bachelor of Laws from Stanford Law School in 1964. She was Director of Political Research and Analysis for the Goldwater for President Committee in 1964. From 1965 to 1966, she was vice president of Rus Walton and Associates in Los Altos, California. Rymer then entered private practice from 1966 through 1983 in Los Angeles, California. She was also a member and chairman of the California Post-Secondary Education Commission from 1974 to 1984.

== Federal judicial service ==
On January 31, 1983, Rymer was nominated by President Ronald Reagan to a seat on the United States District Court for the Central District of California vacated by Judge William Percival Gray. She was confirmed by the United States Senate on February 23, 1983, and received her commission the following day. Her service terminated on May 23, 1989, due to elevation to the court of appeals.

In 1987, Reagan attempted to elevate Rymer to a seat on the United States Court of Appeals for the Ninth Circuit vacated by the elevation of Anthony Kennedy to the Supreme Court of the United States, but was rebuffed in the Senate. However, on February 28, 1989, President George H. W. Bush nominated Rymer to the same seat, and this time, she was confirmed by the United States Senate on May 18, 1989, receiving her commission on May 22, 1989.

== Stanford service ==
Rymer served on the Stanford University Board of Trustees from 1991 to 2001. In 2010, Rymer received the Stanford Medal for her volunteer work for the university, where two scholarship funds had been created in her name.

== Death ==
Rymer died on September 21, 2011. During her 22 years on the Ninth Circuit, Rymer sat on more than 800 panels and wrote 335 panel decisions. One of the more notable opinions was in Planned Parenthood v. American Coalition of Life Activists (2002), which held that threats on the Internet against doctors who performed abortions were not protected by the First Amendment. Fellow judge Stephen Trott said she was a "brilliant jurist" and "a joy to work with".

== See also ==
- Ronald Reagan judicial appointment controversies
- Film: "This Changes Everything" (starting at 59:00) regarding action alleging employment discrimination in violation of Title VII of the Civil Rights Act of 1964. She threw the case out.

Legal offices
| Preceded by William Percival Gray | Judge of the United States District Court for the Central District of California; 1983–1989 | Succeeded by Robert C. Bonner |
| Preceded by Anthony Kennedy | Judge of the United States Court of Appeals for the Ninth Circuit; 1989–2011 | Succeeded by Paul J. Watford |
