= William Percival Gray =

American judge

Senior Judge of the United States District Court for the Central District of California
- In office March 26, 1982 – February 10, 1992

Judge of the United States District Court for the Central District of California
- In office September 18, 1966 – March 26, 1982
- Appointed by: operation of law
- Preceded by: Seat established by 80 Stat. 75
- Succeeded by: Pamela Ann Rymer

Judge of the United States District Court for the Southern District of California
- In office July 2, 1966 – September 18, 1966
- Appointed by: Lyndon B. Johnson
- Preceded by: Harry Clay Westover
- Succeeded by: Seat abolished

Personal details
- Born: William Percival Gray; March 26, 1912 Los Angeles, California
- Died: February 10, 1992 (aged 79) Pasadena, California
- Education: University of California, Los Angeles (A.B.); Harvard Law School (LL.B.)

William Percival Gray (March 26, 1912 – February 10, 1992) was a United States district judge of the United States District Court for the Central District of California.

== Education and career ==
Born in Los Angeles, California, Gray received an Artium Baccalaureus degree from the University of California, Los Angeles in 1934 and a Bachelor of Laws from Harvard Law School in 1939. He was a law clerk to Judge Harold Montelle Stephens of the United States Court of Appeals for the District of Columbia Circuit from 1939 to 1940, and was in private practice in Los Angeles from 1940 to 1941. He served in the United States Army during World War II, from 1941 to 1945, achieving the rank of lieutenant colonel. After the war, he returned to private practice in Los Angeles from 1945 to 1966, also serving as a special assistant to the United States Attorney General from 1958 to 1964. During his professional career, Gray served as the president of the Los Angeles County Bar Association in 1956, and as the president of the California State Bar in 1962-1963.

== Federal judicial service ==
On June 13, 1966, Gray was nominated by President Lyndon B. Johnson to a seat on the United States District Court for the Southern District of California vacated by Judge Harry Clay Westover. Gray was confirmed by the United States Senate on June 29, 1966, and received his commission on July 2, 1966. Gray served in that capacity until September 18, 1966, when he was reassigned by operation of law to the United States District Court for the Central District of California, to a new seat established by 80 Stat. 75. He assumed senior status on March 26, 1982, serving in that capacity until his death on February 10, 1992, in Pasadena, California.

Gray, a widely respected jurist, was noted for his rulings in favor of inmates who challenged overcrowding in Los Angeles County and Orange County prisons, including a 1978 ruling that held Orange County Sheriff Brad Gates and members of the Orange County Board of Supervisors in contempt.

The William P. Gray Legion Lex American Inn of Court in Orange County is named in Gray's honor.

== Sources ==
Legal offices
Preceded by Harry Clay Westover	Judge of the United States District Court for the Southern District of California; 1966	Succeeded by Seat abolished
Preceded by Seat established by 80 Stat. 75	Judge of the United States District Court for the Central District of California; 1966–1982	Succeeded by Pamela Ann Rymer
