= Francis M. Mullen =

American law enforcement officer

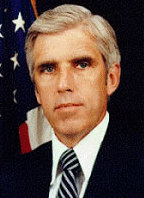

3rd Administrator of the Drug Enforcement Administration
- In office July 10, 1981 – March 1, 1985; Acting: July 10, 1981 - November 10, 1983
- President: Ronald Reagan
- Preceded by: Peter B. Bensinger
- Succeeded by: John C. Lawn

Personal details
- Born: December 14, 1934 (age 91) New London, Connecticut
- Education: Central Connecticut State College (BS)

Military service
- Allegiance: United States
- Branch/service: United States Air Force
- Years of service: 1953–1957

Francis M. "Bud" Mullen, Jr. (born 14 December 1934 in New London, Connecticut) is a former executive assistant director of the Federal Bureau of Investigation (FBI) and former Administrator of the Drug Enforcement Administration (DEA).

== Biography ==
Mullen began his life in New London, Connecticut, where after graduating from Central Connecticut State College (B.S. 1962) he served in the United States Air Force from 1953 to 1957. He became a police officer in New London, before being appointed as an FBI Special Agent in 1962.

=== Service with the DEA 1981-1985 ===
In July 1981, Mullen was designated Acting Administrator of the DEA. However, it was not until 21 January 1982 that President Ronald Reagan announced his intention to nominate Mullen as DEA Administrator, succeeding Peter Bensinger. Mullen served in an acting capacity from July 1981 until he was confirmed by the U.S. Senate on 30 September 1983 and sworn in as the DEA's third Administrator on 10 November 1983. He served until 1 March 1985.

== After DEA ==
After retiring from DEA on 1 March 1985, Mullen became the director of the Mohegan Tribal Gaming Commission in Uncasville, Connecticut at the Mohegan Sun Casino. He has since retired from that position. He was the Republican nominee for Connecticut's 2nd congressional district in 1986, being defeated by incumbent Democratic congressman Sam Gejdenson.

Government offices
Preceded by Peter B. Bensinger	Administrator of the Drug Enforcement Administration; 1981–1985	Succeeded by John C. Lawn
