= Robert C. Bonner =

American judge (born 1942)

Robert Cleve Bonner
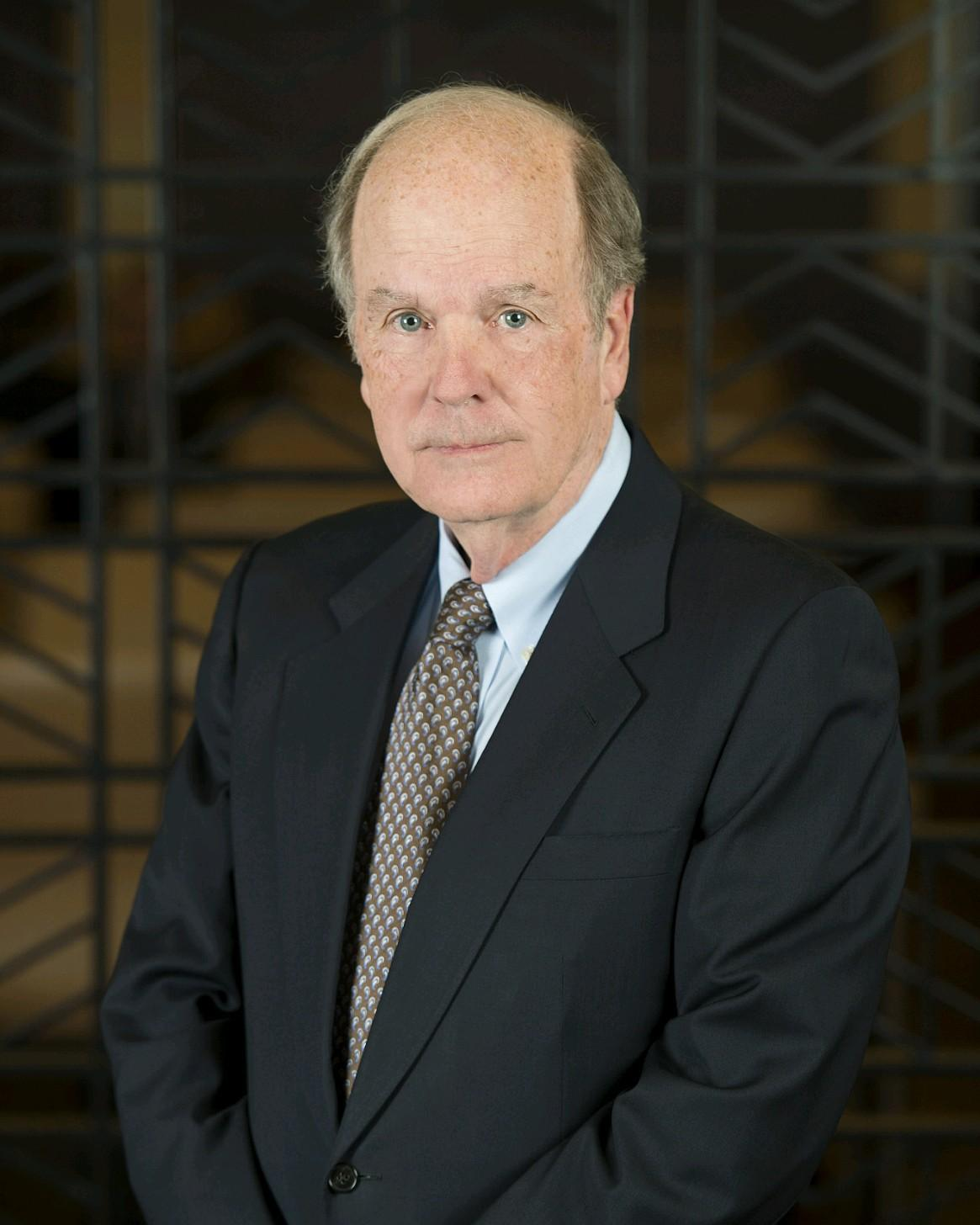

United States Commissioner of Customs and Border Protection
- In office March 1, 2003 – November 30, 2005
- President: George W. Bush
- Preceded by: Office created
- Succeeded by: Ralph Basham

Commissioner of the United States Customs Service
- In office September 10, 2001 – March 1, 2003
- President: George W. Bush
- Preceded by: Raymond W. Kelly
- Succeeded by: Office abolished

5th Administrator of the Drug Enforcement Administration
- In office August 13, 1990 – October 31, 1993
- President: George H. W. Bush; Bill Clinton
- Preceded by: Terrence M. Burke (Acting)
- Succeeded by: Stephen H. Greene (Acting)

Judge of the United States District Court for the Central District of California
- In office May 24, 1989 – August 12, 1990
- Appointed by: George H. W. Bush
- Preceded by: Pamela Ann Rymer
- Succeeded by: Audrey B. Collins

United States Attorney for the Central District of California
- In office February 15, 1984 – June 16, 1989
- President: Ronald Reagan; George H. W. Bush
- Preceded by: Stephen S. Trott
- Succeeded by: Gary A. Feess

Personal details
- Born: Robert Cleve Bonner; January 29, 1942 (age 84) Wichita, Kansas
- Party: Republican
- Education: University of Maryland, College Park (BA); Georgetown University (JD)
- Website: Biography at Gibson, Dunn & Crutcher LLP website

Military service
- Allegiance: United States
- Branch/service: United States Navy
- Years of service: 1967–1971
- Rank: Lieutenant
- Unit: United States Navy Judge Advocate General's Corps

Robert Cleve Bonner (January 29, 1942) is an American lawyer and arbitration neutral, a former prosecutor, former United States District Judge, former Administrator of the Drug Enforcement Administration and former Commissioner of United States Customs and Border Protection. He is a member of the board of trustees of the California Institute of Technology, a retired partner at the law firm Gibson, Dunn & Crutcher and former chair of the California Commission on Judicial Performance.

== Education and early career ==
Bonner was born in Wichita, Kansas. He grew up in Wichita where his father practiced law and his mother was a school teacher. He credits his mother for infusing him with a strong commitment to public service. He received a Bachelor of Arts degree magna cum laude from the University of Maryland, College Park in 1963. and a Juris Doctor from Georgetown University Law Center in 1966.

He was a law clerk for Albert Lee Stephens Jr. of the United States District Court for the Southern District of California from 1966 to 1967. He was on in the United States Navy Reserve Judge Advocate General Corps from 1967 to 1971, rising to the rank of Lieutenant, USNR. During that time, he served for nearly two years on an aircraft carrier, the USS Franklin D. Roosevelt (CVA-42). He was an Assistant United States Attorney for the Central District of California from 1971 to 1975, and then went into private practice in Los Angeles for nine years. Afterwards he became the United States Attorney for the same district in 1984. As a United States Attorney, he worked closely with the Drug Enforcement Administration (DEA) on two record-breaking money laundering cases, Operations Pisces and Polar Cap, led the prosecution team against the killers of a DEA special agent, and personally prosecuted the first FBI agent charged with espionage.

== Federal judicial service ==
On February 28, 1989, Bonner was nominated by President George H. W. Bush to be a United States District Judge of the United States District Court for the Central District of California, to a seat vacated by Judge Pamela Ann Rymer. He was confirmed by the United States Senate on May 18, 1989, and received commission on May 24, 1989. Bonner resigned on August 12, 1990, to become the Administrator of the DEA.

== DEA service ==
On May 11, 1990, President Bush nominated him to be Administrator of the DEA. He was confirmed by the United States Senate on July 27, 1990, and sworn in as the DEA's fifth Administrator on August 13, 1990. Bonner served as Administrator from August 13, 1990, to October 31, 1993. As DEA Administrator, Bonner is credited with implementing the Kingpin Strategy, which allows law enforcement to target and attack key vulnerabilities of major transnational drug trafficking organizations. He oversaw DEA's efforts with the Colombian government to destroy the Medellin Cartel, the final blow of which was the killing of Pablo Escobar by the Colombian National Police in late 1993. While at DEA, he also established the first Division of Intelligence within DEA and pioneered the use of highly effective intelligence gathering and analytical tools.

In 1992, Administrator Bonner issued a ruling that incorporated the FDA's "safe and effective" standard to evaluate marijuana. After reviewing the record, he found that there were no valid scientific studies that indicated that smoking marijuana was safe and effective for any medical purpose. On that basis, he denied an application for the removal of cannabis from Schedule I of the Controlled Substances Act, stating that, "Those who insist that marijuana has medical uses would serve society better by promoting or sponsoring more legitimate scientific research, rather than throwing their time, money and rhetoric into lobbying, public relations campaigns and perennial litigation.

== Private practice ==
In November 1993, just after leaving his post as head of the DEA, Bonner appeared on 60 Minutes and criticized the CIA for permitting a drug shipment of one ton of pure cocaine to be smuggled into the U.S. without first notifying and securing the approval of the DEA. From 1993 to 2001, Judge Bonner was a partner in the Los Angeles and Washington, D.C. law firm Gibson, Dunn & Crutcher, an international law firm. His practice focused on business and white-collar crime matters, complex civil cases, internal corporate investigations, and corporate compliance programs. Among his clients were Occidental Petroleum Chairman Ray Irani, French entrepreneur Francois Pinault, former president of Serbia Milan Panic, ConAgra, Walmart, Waste Management, Inc., the California Institute of Technology, and the cities of Long Beach and Thousand Oaks. He also defended Heidi Fleiss in her federal tax evasion prosecution.

== United States Customs Service ==
On June 24, 2001, President George W. Bush nominated Bonner as Commissioner of the United States Customs Service, later known as U.S. Customs and Border Protection (CBP), and he was confirmed on September 19, 2001, a little more than a week after the September 11 attacks. During his time as commissioner, Bonner implemented far-reaching security changes, including the establishment of the National Targeting Center, the Container Security Initiative (CSI), and the Customs-Trade Partnership Against Terrorism (C-TPAT).

As part of the homeland security re-organization of 2003, Bonner was appointed the first commissioner of CBP, a merger of the Border Patrol and other front line immigration and agriculture protection functions with most of the United States Customs Service to create the first unified border agency in U.S. history. It remains the largest merger of people and functions within the Department of Homeland Security, affecting nearly 60,000 employees. Bonner announced his resignation as commissioner on September 28, 2005, and retired on November 25, 2005, after four years of service. He is featured in the documentary "The New Colossus," by Professor Alan Marcus, where he discusses post-9/11 border security measures.

== Later career ==
After returning to Gibson, Dunn & Crutcher, Bonner was hired by Representative Jerry Lewis in 2006 after Lewis was linked to an investigation being conducted by the U.S. Department of Justice (see Jerry Lewis - Lowery lobbying firm controversy). Lewis did not ultimately face charges. On August 12, 2007, Bonner was named by the Rudy Giuliani Presidential Committee as a member of the campaign's "Immigration Advisory Board". Bonner has continued his involvement with border security and immigration, and was appointed to several task forces of the Homeland Security Advisory Council (HSAC), including the Southwest Border Task Force in 2009, and the HSAC Integrity Advisory Panel in 2015. In addition, he has served on the Council on Foreign Relations task forces on U.S. Immigration Policy and North America, is the co-chair of the Pacific Council task force on U.S.‑Mexico border issues, is the chair of the Civilian Oversight Commission for the Los Angeles County Sheriff's Department, and is the co-chair of the International Summit on Borders. He retired as a partner of Gibson, Dunn & Crutcher to become a Senior Principal of The Sentinel Company, a Washington, D.C.–based homeland security consulting firm, and also heads Bonner Arbitration Disputes and Settlement Services and serves as an American Arbitration Association neutral arbitrator for high stakes disputes.

== Other interests ==
Bonner is married to Kimiko Tanaka Bonner, and they have a daughter, Justine. He runs three miles a day, and enjoys playing tennis and chess, a game he mastered while serving in the United States Navy on board an aircraft carrier.

Government offices
Preceded by John C. Lawn	Administrator of the Drug Enforcement Administration; 1990–1993	Succeeded by Stephen H. Greene (acting)
Legal offices
Preceded by Pamela Ann Rymer	Judge of the United States District Court for the Central District of California; 1989–1990	Succeeded by Audrey B. Collins
