= Henry S. Dogin =

American criminal prosecutor and attorney

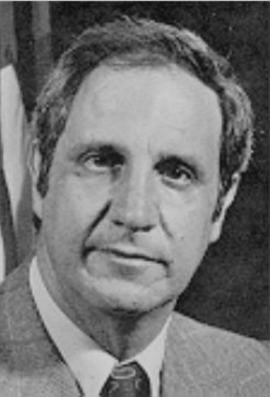

Deputy Assistant Attorney General and Chief of the United States Organized Crime Strike Force
- In office 1973–1975

Acting Administrator of the Drug Enforcement Administration
- In office May 30, 1975 – January 23, 1975
- Appointed by: President Gerald R. Ford
- Preceded by: John R. Bartels Jr.
- Succeeded by: Peter B. Bensinger

Administrator of the Law Enforcement Assistance Administration
- In office 1978–1980
- Appointed by: President Jimmy Carter

Personal details
- Born: December 26, 1934 (age 91) Brooklyn, New York
- Spouse: Cynthia Dogin
- Education: Cornell University (BA) Cornell Law School (LL.B)

Military service
- Branch/service: United States Navy; 1956-1958

Henry Stanley Dogin is an American lawyer and law enforcement administrator, and has been involved in many organizations in the United States Department of Justice (DOJ) and the Federal government of the United States.

== Early life ==
In 1956, Dogin graduated from Cornell University with a bachelor's degree. In 1961, he obtained an LL. B. from the Columbia School of Law.

Dogin served in the U.S. Navy from 1956 to 1958.

== Career in the federal government ==
From 1961 to 1967, Dogin was Assistant District Attorney for New York County.

From 1967 to 1971, he was assistant counsel to the Waterfront Commission of New York Harbor.

From 1971 to 1973, he served as Deputy Regional Administrator of the New York Regional Office of the Law Enforcement Assistance Administration (LEAA).

From 1973 to 1975, Dogin was Deputy Assistant Attorney General for the Criminal Division. While in this position, Dogin oversaw the United States Organized Crime Strike Force.

On May 30, 1975, Dogin was appointed Acting Administrator of the Drug Enforcement Administration (DEA), where he worked in a transitionary period for the DEA. The first Administrator of the Drug Enforcement Administration, John R. Bartels Jr., had resigned amid scandal after being forced out of the administration by Attorney General Edward H. Levi. Dogin remained at DEA for only 6 months, leaving the agency on January 23, 1975. Peter B. Bensinger became the 2nd Administrator of the DEA shortly afterward.

From 1976 to 1978, he was deputy commissioner of the New York State Division of Criminal Justice Services (DCJS).

From 1978 to 1979, he was Deputy Administrator of LEAA for Policy Development and served as Acting Administrator. In 1979, Dogin was confirmed by the Senate as Administrator of the LEAA. While serving in this position, LEAA published a document addressing police brutality in the United States. Dogin wrote:

"LEAA will continue to assist police administrators, lawmakers, and city administrators as they strive to formulate clear direction and guidance to our Nation's law enforcement officers charged with the awesome responsibility of determining the need and degree of force and ultimately the use of deadly force in violent situations. Intensive and continuous training, appropriate guidelines, practices and controls must be addressed in order to reduce and restrict the use of force and deadly force by police without risking and jeopardizing their lives."

In 1980, LEAA was merged into the Office of Justice Assistance, Research, and Statistics (JARS). On February 8, 1980, President Jimmy Carter nominated Henry S. Dogin as Director of JARS.

Dogin was in the 1990s and 2000s an immigration judge in the Newark Immigration Office of the United States Department of Justice Executive Office for Immigration Review.
