= Jules Heningburg =

American professional lacrosse player

Personal information
- Nationality: American
- Born: May 3, 1996 (age 29) Maplewood, New Jersey, U.S.
- Height: 6 ft 2 in (188 cm)
- Weight: 205 lb (93 kg; 14 st 9 lb)
- Website: www.julesheningburg.com

Sport
- Position: Attack
- Shoots: Right
- NCAA team: Rutgers University (2018)
- NLL draft: 38th overall, 2018; San Diego Seals
- MLL draft: 7th overall, 2018; Florida Launch
- PLL team Former teams: Boston Cannons; California Redwoods; Carolina Chaos
- Pro career: 2018–

Career highlights
- PLL: 3× All-Star (2019, 2021, 2022)

Jules Nehemiah Heningburg (born May 3, 1996) is an American professional lacrosse player on the Boston Cannons of the Premier Lacrosse League. As a member of the Redwoods, he was a 4x All-Star. He played college lacrosse at Rutgers University where he was a two-time All-Big Ten selection and All-American (2018 Second Team, 2017 Honorable Mention). Heningburg was selected 7th overall in the first round of the 2018 Major League Lacrosse Draft by the Florida Launch.

== Early life and college ==
Heningburg grew up in Maplewood, New Jersey as the fifth of six children of a Black father, Gus Heningburg Jr., and a white mother, Maria Morrison Heningburg. His grandfather, Gus Sr., was a civil rights activist, while his grandmother, Jean, was the first Black teacher at Montclair High School. He played high school lacrosse for Columbia High School before transferring to Seton Hall Preparatory School. He chose to keep his lacrosse talent in New Jersey for college, heading to Rutgers University. In his four years with the Scarlet Knights, Heningburg started all 60 games he appeared in.

== Professional Field Lacrosse Career ==
=== 2018: Florida Launch ===
Heningburg was drafted 7th overall by the Florida Launch in the 2018 Major League Lacrosse Draft. He made 8 regular season appearances. With Jules joining approximately 140 other players leaving the MLL to sign with the PLL, the MLL was forced to contract the league footprint. As a result, the Launch franchise folded during the 2019 MLL offseason.

=== 2019: Whipsnakes Lacrosse Club ===
Heningburg left the MLL for the PLL in the upstart league's first season. At the inception of the Premier Lacrosse League, Heningburg was assigned to the Whipsnakes roster. The inaugural 2019 season began on June 1, and Heningburg saw action in three games for the Whipsnakes before being traded to the Redwoods on June 17 in exchange for Alec Tulett and a fourth round draft pick in 2020.

=== 2019–2023: Redwoods Lacrosse Club ===
Heningburg played for the Redwoods of the Premier Lacrosse League for 5 seasons. He finished his first season with 33 regular season points and helped steer the Redwoods to the championship game were the Redwoods fell to Heningburg's former team, the Whipsnakes, by a score of 12-11 in overtime. During the 2020 off-season, the Redwoods used one of their protected roster spots to keep Heningburg from being selected in the Expansion Draft by the Waterdogs Lacrosse Club. During the COVID-19 shortened 2020 Premier Lacrosse League season, it was revealed by league doctors that Heningburg would have to sit out the bubble championship series due to an underlying health condition. Heningburg returned to the PLL in 2021, where he scored 52 points over his next 3 seasons. In 2023, his contract with the Redwoods expired and he entered free agency.

=== 2024: Carolina Chaos ===
On March 7, Heningburg signed a one-year deal with the Carolina Chaos. He spent the 2024 season with the team, scoring 15 points in 9 games. Heningburg was waived on May 27, as a part of the last round of cuts before the 25-man roster for the 2025 season.

=== 2025-Present: Boston Cannons ===
After going the first half of the season unsigned, Heningburg hopped in the booth for the PLL All-Star game, giving color commentary. On July 9, Heningburg signed with the Boston Cannons. He scored 3 points in his debut.

== Professional Box Lacrosse Career ==
=== 2019: San Diego Seals and IBLA ===
Heningburg was promoted to the San Diego Seals active roster from the practice squad on February 8, 2019. He appeared in one game. That summer, he worked to improve his indoor lacrosse game in the Interstate Box Lacrosse Association (IBLA). Heningburg was a staple of the Minneapolis Wheat Kings's run to third place in the IBLA Nationals Tournament in Huntington Beach, California.

=== 2020-2023: New England Black Wolves and Albany FireWolves ===
Heningburg returned to the National Lacrosse League in September 2020 on a contract with the New England Black Wolves. In February 2021, the Black Wolves announced a move to Albany with new ownership. He did not appear in another match for the FireWolves, after spending some time on the holdout list, he was waived on March 3, 2023.

== Statistics ==
=== MLL ===
Season	Team	GP	G	2ptG	A	Pts	GB
Major League Lacrosse
2018	Florida	8	15	0	10	25	5
Totals		8	15	0	10	25	5

=== PLL ===
Season	Team	Regular season											Playoffs										
Season	Team	GP	G	2PG	A	Pts	Sh	GB	Pen	PIM	FOW	FOA	GP	G	2PG	A	Pts	Sh	GB	Pen	PIM	FOW	FOA
2019	Whipsnakes	3	3	0	2	5	13	3	0	0	0	0	–	–	–	–	–	–	–	–	–	–	–
2019	Redwoods	7	18	0	10	28	41	5	0	0	0	0	3	4	0	2	6	13	4	0	0	0	0
2021	Redwoods	9	15	0	5	20	31	6	0	0	0	0	1	3	0	3	6	4	1	0	0	0	0
2022	Redwoods	8	12	0	7	19	36	10	0	0	0	0	1	0	0	2	2	3	0	0	0	0	0
2023	Redwoods	10	7	0	6	13	31	7	0	0	0	0	2	2	0	1	3	8	0	0	0	0	0
2024	Carolina Chaos	9	10	0	5	15	31	6	1	1	0	0	2	1	0	1	2	7	0	0	0	0	0
2025	Boston Cannons	4	2	1	1	4	11	1	0	0	0	0	–	–	–	–	–	–	–	–	–	–	–
		50	67	1	36	104	194	38	1	1	0	0	9	10	0	9	19	28	5	0	0	0	0
Career total:		59	77	1	45	123	222	43	1	1	0	0											

GP–Games played; G–Goals; 2PG–2-point goals; A–Assists; Pts–Points; Sh–Shots; GB–Ground balls; Pen–Penalties; PIM–Penalty minutes; FOW–Faceoffs won; FOA–Faceoffs attempted

=== NLL ===
Jules Heningburg		Regular season									Playoffs								
Season	Team	GP	G	A	Pts	LB	PIM	Pts/GP	LB/GP	PIM/GP	GP	G	A	Pts	LB	PIM	Pts/GP	LB/GP	PIM/GP
2019	San Diego Seals	1	1	0	1	0	5	1.00	0.00	5.00	–	–	–	–	–	–	–	–	–
		1	1	0	1	0	5	1.00	0.00	5.00	0	0	0	0	0	0	0.00	0.00	0.00
Career Total:		1	1	0	1	0	5	1.00	0.00	5.00									

GP–Games played; G–Goals; A–Assists; Pts–Points; LB–Loose balls; PIM–Penalty minutes; Pts/GP–Points per games played; LB/GP–Loose balls per games played; PIM/GP–Penalty minutes per games played.

=== NCAA ===
Season	Team	GP	G	A	Pts	GB
2015	Rutgers	15	21	8	29	25
2016	Rutgers	16	39	21	60	24
2017	Rutgers	14	20	26	46	20
2018	Rutgers	15	37	35	72	29
Totals		60	117	90	207	98

== Personal life ==
Heningburg is a founding member of the Black Lacrosse Alliance, which seeks to "push the culture of lacrosse forward to become more inclusive and inspire a more diverse generation of lacrosse players."
