= John C. Lawn =

Former administer of the Drug Enforcement Administration

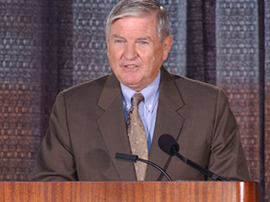

4th Administrator of the Drug Enforcement Administration
- In office March 1, 1985 – March 23, 1990; Acting: March 1, 1985 – July 26, 1985
- President: Ronald Reagan; George H. W. Bush
- Preceded by: Francis M. Mullen
- Succeeded by: Robert C. Bonner

Personal details
- Born: June 2, 1935 (age 91) Brooklyn, New York City, U.S.

John C. Lawn (born June 2, 1935) is an American former police officer who served as the 4th Administrator of the Drug Enforcement Administration (DEA) from 1985 to 1990. On March 1, 1985, Lawn, who had served as Deputy Administrator since 1982, was designated Acting Administrator following the retirement of Francis M. Mullen. On April 4, 1985, he was nominated by President Ronald Reagan to be the next Administrator of the DEA. Mr. Lawn was confirmed by the U.S. Senate on July 16, 1985, and sworn in on July 26, 1985.

Before coming to the DEA, Mr. Lawn had served for 15 years as a Special Agent of the Federal Bureau of Investigation (FBI) from 1967 to 1982. As Special Agent in Charge of the San Antonio field office from 1980 to 1982, he had directed the successful investigation into the assassination of U.S. District Judge John H. Wood Jr. Before this historic case, Lawn had supervised all FBI civil rights cases, including allegations of police brutality and color of law complaints. In addition, he was responsible for background investigations of White House officials, federal judges, and US attorney nominees. He also served in the Criminal Division of FBI headquarters where he supervised the United States House Select Committee on Assassinations review of the 1963 assassination of John F. Kennedy and the 1968 assassination of Martin Luther King Jr.

From 1990-1994, Mr. Lawn served as vice-president and chief of operations of the New York Yankees. In 1998, he was serving as the chairman and CEO of The Century Council, a national organization dedicated to fighting alcohol abuse. On Thursday, September 30, 2010, in Washington, D.C., the DEA Educational Foundation honored Mr. Lawn, presenting him with the 2010 DEA Educational Foundation Lifetime Achievement Award. This award was presented in recognition of his decades of leadership and commitment to drug law enforcement, drug abuse prevention, and drug treatment.

Government offices
Preceded by Francis M. Mullen	Administrator of the Drug Enforcement Administration; 1985–1990	Succeeded by Robert C. Bonner
