= Harry Clay Westover =

American judge (1894–1983)

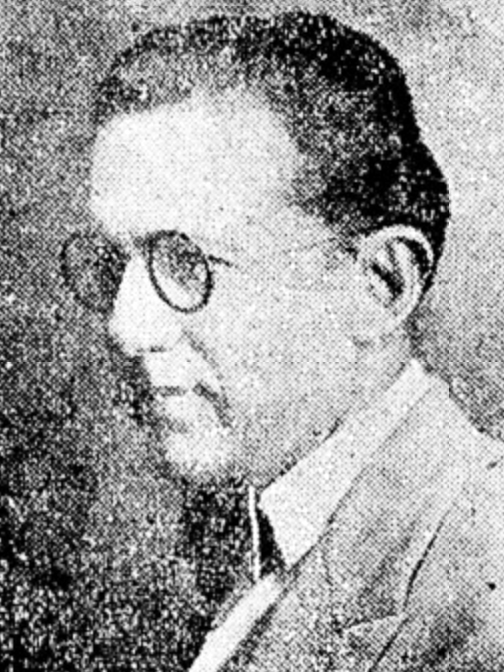
- Westover in 1927

Senior Judge of the United States District Court for the Southern District of California
- In office December 31, 1965 – April 14, 1983

Judge of the United States District Court for the Southern District of California
- In office October 18, 1949 – December 31, 1965
- Appointed by: Harry S. Truman
- Preceded by: Seat established by 63 Stat. 493
- Succeeded by: William Percival Gray

Member of the California Senate from the 35th district
- In office January 4, 1937 – January 6, 1941
- Preceded by: Nelson T. Edwards
- Succeeded by: Thomas Kuchel

Personal details
- Born: Harry Clay Westover; May 19, 1894 Williamstown, Kentucky
- Died: April 14, 1983 (aged 88) Laguna Hills, California
- Party: Democratic
- Spouse: Helen Louise Equen Westover
- Children: 2
- Education: James E. Rogers College of Law (LL.B.)

Military service
- Allegiance: United States
- Branch/service: United States Army
- Rank: 2nd Lieutenant

Harry Clay Westover (May 19, 1894 – April 14, 1983) was a United States district judge of the United States District Court for the Southern District of California.

== Education and career ==
Born in Williamstown, Kentucky, Westover received a Bachelor of Laws from the James E. Rogers College of Law at the University of Arizona in 1918. After graduating from college, he became a 2nd lieutenant in the Central Machine Guns Corps of the United States Army and was stationed at Camp Hancock, Georgia until January 1919. He later became a member of the California State Senate, and Collector of Internal Revenue for the sixth district of California.

== Federal judicial service ==
On September 23, 1949, Westover was nominated by President Harry S. Truman to a new seat on the United States District Court for the Southern District of California created by 63 Stat. 493. He was confirmed by the United States Senate on October 15, 1949, and received his commission on October 18, 1949. He assumed senior status on December 31, 1965, serving in that capacity until his death on April 14, 1983, in Laguna Hills, California.

== Sources ==
Legal offices
Preceded by Seat established by 63 Stat. 493	Judge of the United States District Court for the Southern District of California; 1949–1965	Succeeded by William Percival Gray
