= D. Christopher Evans =

American lawyer and acting DEA administrator

Chris Evans
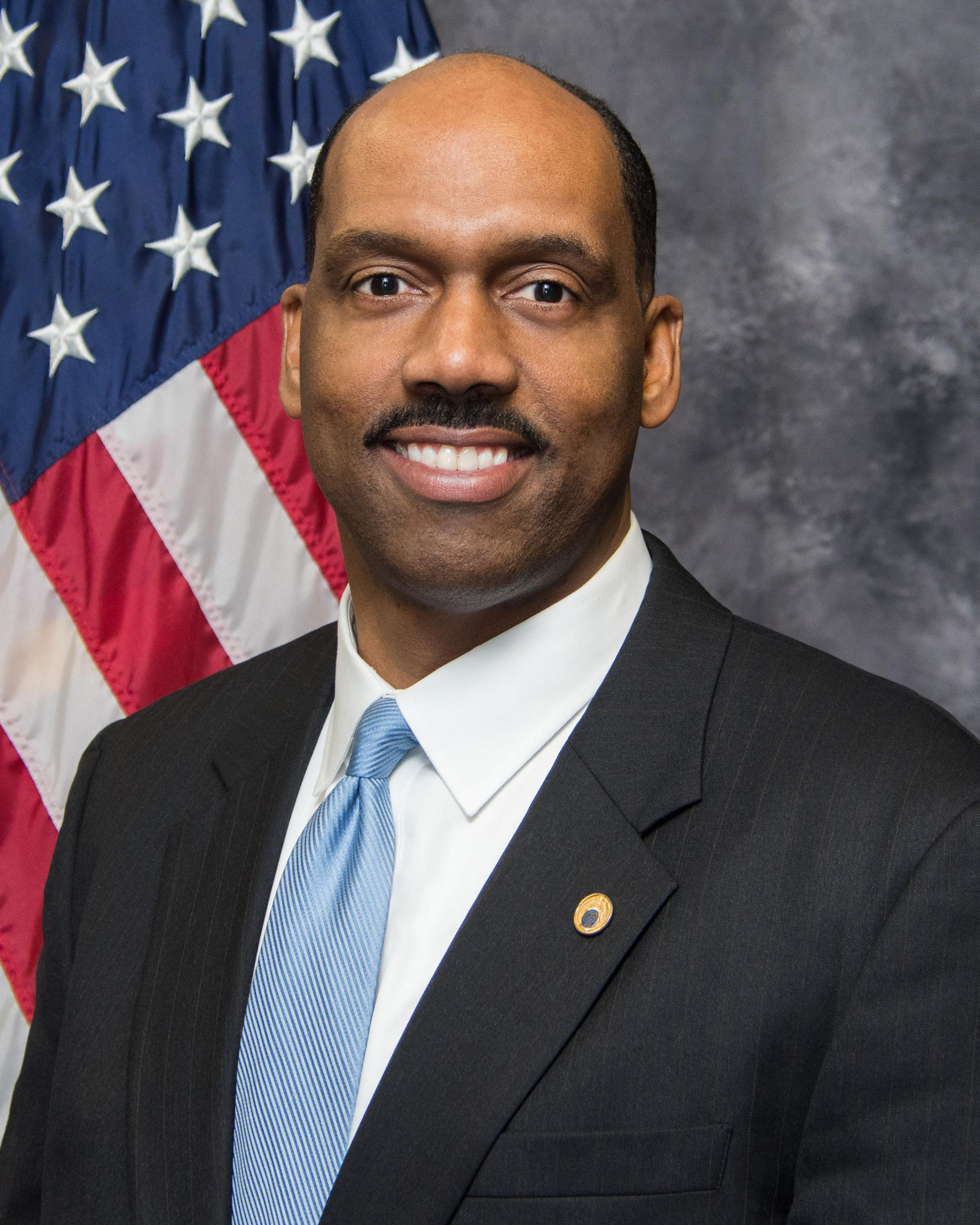

Acting Administrator of the Drug Enforcement Administration
- In office January 20, 2021 – June 28, 2021
- President: Joe Biden
- Deputy: Preston Grubbs
- Preceded by: Timothy Shea (Acting)
- Succeeded by: Anne Milgram

Personal details
- Education: Rutgers University (BA, MA)

D. Christopher Evans is an American law enforcement officer who served as the acting Administrator of the Drug Enforcement Administration from January to June 2021.

== Early life and education ==
Evans is a graduate of Rutgers University with a Bachelor of Arts degree in urban studies and a Master of Arts in political science.

== Career ==
Evans began his law enforcement career with the Drug Enforcement Administration (DEA) in 1992.

Evans previously served as chief of operations and assistant administrator of the DEA's Operations Division, as well as chief of the DEA's Special Operations Division.
