= Operation Intercept =

1969 American anti-drug measure

- Date: 21 September to 11 October 1969
- Location: United States-Mexico

Operation Intercept was an anti-drug measure engaged by President Richard Nixon from 21 September to 11 October 1969 that resulted in a near shutdown of border crossings between Mexico and the United States. The initiative was intended to reduce the importation of Mexican marijuana to the United States during what was considered to be the prime harvest season. It was implemented by Myles Ambrose, who served as the Commissioner of Customs in the Nixon administration.

== Description ==
Freshly elected as US President, Richard Nixon launched an anti-drug war by following his Anaheim campaign pledge of September 1968. He targeted the cannabis coming from Mexico and the heroin coming from Turkey through the French Connection. Operation Intercept is considered the opening act of the US involvement in the Mexican drug war. With that move, Nixon strengthened his conservative base in Southern California. The operation was prepared with G. Gordon Liddy (who was involved in Watergate and prosecutions against Timothy Leary) and Arizona sheriff Joe Arpaio.

The policy was instituted as a surprise move although Nixon had given Mexican President Gustavo Diaz Ordaz some advance warning when they met on September 8, 1969 to dedicate the Lake Amistad Dam International Crossing. The effort involved increased surveillance of the border from both air and sea, but the major part of the policy was the individual inspection, mandated to last three minutes, of every vehicle crossing into the United States from Mexico. On the same day, Nixon's plan was leaked to the public by the White House correspondent for The New York Times Felix Belair, Jr.

The operation was deployed in all 30 border-crossing stations. Radars were installed to detect unobserved border-crossings. The Navy was deployed in the Gulf of Mexico to reinforce the operation. Twenty-seven international airports in the US with flights from Mexico were also affected by the operation.

On the eighth day, the US authorities declared the ongoing operation was a success, despite many complaints of abusive search techniques by US custom patrols. On the US side of twin cities along the border, retail business dropped more than 50%. The United States-Mexican Border Cities Association organized protests against the operation in those cities.

Because of complaints from cross-border travelers and from Diaz Ordaz, the searching of vehicles was reduced after 10 days and completely abandoned after about 20 days.

The Nixon administration believed that it had largely achieved its goal of encouraging the Mexican government to begin an effort to stem domestic drug production. California Governor Ronald Reagan made a public speech on television to approve the operation.

== Aftermath ==
Operation Intercept was disapproved by the State Department and the Bureau of the Budget. Statistics on the volumes of cannabis seized were way below expectations and did not exceed the average volumes that had been seized before the operation. Much of US press publicized marijuana during the crisis. Other temporary illegal smuggling channels were activated during the operation, such as high-potent marijuana shipped from Vietnam and of hashish from Northern Africa. A marijuana shortage throughout the country led users to experiment with other drugs or to grow their own.

G. Gordon Liddy would later state, "For diplomatic reasons the true purpose of the exercise was never revealed. Operation Intercept, with its massive economic and social disruption, could be sustained far longer by the United States than by Mexico. It was an exercise in international extortion, pure, simple, and effective, designed to bend Mexico to our will." When the operation was ceased, it was replaced by Operation Cooperation, a new anti-drug agreement aiming at designing a shared strategy in fighting drug trafficking. According to Kate Doyle, senior analyst of the National Security Archive, the operation was a success for Nixon on three levels: he gained law-and-order stamina, made Mexico bend to his demands, and started a war on drugs that would last for decades.

On the national level, the anti-Mexican campaign had an impact on the stereotype of Mexicans conveyed in the press. Along the border, it revealed how deeply intertwined the Mexican and American border communities were.

In early 1970, the Jefferson Airplane released a single, "Mexico." The song was not played on some radio stations at the time because the lyrics referred to Operation Intercept, but this song became a classic on many of the so-called underground radio stations.

Operation Intercept is sometimes referred to in the issue of the Mexico–United States border wall.
