= Pen-Link =

American software company

Pen-Link, Ltd. (PenLink)
- Headquarters: Lincoln, Nebraska, USA
- Products: PLX, Pen-Link 8, LINCOLN2, PenProxy, Xnet
- Owner: Spire Capital
- Website: http://www.penlink.com/

Pen-Link, Ltd., (PenLink) is a software company that develops enterprise-grade communications surveillance data collection and analysis products for domestic law enforcement.

== History ==
In July 2023, PenLink merged with Israeli surveillance contractor Cobwebs Technologies, when the latter was acquired for $200 million by private equity firm Spire Capital, which also owns PenLink.

== Products ==
PenLink's flagship products include PenPoint, PLX, Tangles, and WebLoc.

Tangles is a web platform, originally developed and sold by Israeli firm Cobwebs Technologies, that scrapes data from the open web, deep web, and dark web, as well as allowing for the tracking of mobile devices within a user-designated area, in a process known as "geofencing," through an optional add-on feature called WebLoc.

Webloc, developed by Cobwebs Technologies and later marketed by Penlink, is described in research by Citizen Lab as an ad-based geolocation surveillance system reported to have processed data associated with up to 500 million mobile devices. The system uses mobile advertising identifiers, GPS and Wi-Fi location data, IP addresses, and behavioural data collected through mobile applications and digital advertising networks. According to the report, it enables large-scale tracking of location patterns, movement analysis, and inference of behavioural profiles. The research further states that, according to the report, such ad-based surveillance techniques have been used by law enforcement and government agencies in countries including the United States, Hungary, and El Salvador.

One of the more publicized uses of PenLink's products was during the Laci Peterson murder case, where wiretaps taken with Pen-Link 8 and LINCOLN2 were used as evidence against Scott Peterson. Tangles was also used to identify rioters who participated in the January 6 US Capitol attack.

== Clients ==
The company's clients include US Immigration and Customs Enforcement (ICE), which signed a $2.7 million two-year contract with PenLink. Since 2021, ICE has spent over $5 million on surveillance tools made by Cobwebs (which have been sold by PenLink since 2023), including $2 million spent on Tangles in September 2025.

ICE tracks smartphone locations using the company's Webloc tool, which relies on location data gathered by smartphone operating systems for advertising purposes (including unique identifiers for each Google or Apple device).

In 2024 the Texas Department of Public Safety (DPS) signed a $5.3 million five-year contract with the company to supply it with a surveillance tool known as Tangles through 2029, which Texas DPS has used since 2021.

== See also ==
- Lawful interception
- Communications Assistance For Law Enforcement Act
