= Peter B. Bensinger =

American government official (1936–2025)

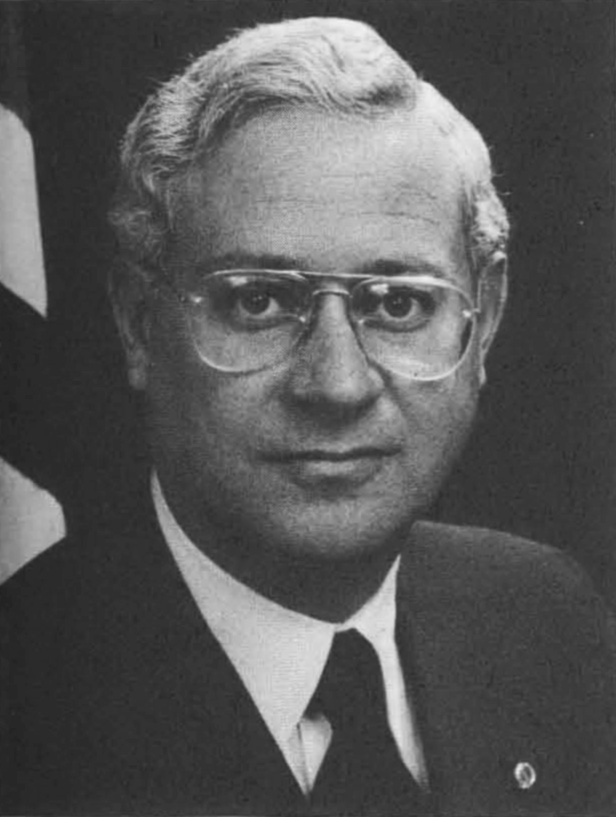

2nd Administrator of the Drug Enforcement Administration
- In office January 23, 1976 – July 10, 1981; Acting: January 23, 1976 – February 23, 1976
- President: Gerald Ford; Jimmy Carter; Ronald Reagan
- Preceded by: Henry S. Dogin (Acting)
- Succeeded by: Francis M. Mullen

Personal details
- Born: March 24, 1936 Chicago, Illinois
- Died: February 11, 2025 (aged 88) Chicago, Illinois
- Education: Phillips Exeter Academy; Yale University

Peter B. Bensinger (March 24, 1936 – February 11, 2025) was an American government official who served as the 2nd Administrator of the Drug Enforcement Administration (DEA) from 1976 to 1981.

== Life and career ==
Bensinger was appointed Acting DEA Administrator on January 23, 1976, and confirmed by the United States Senate on February 5, 1976. Bensinger was sworn in as administrator on February 23, 1976. He served in the administrations of Presidents Gerald Ford, Jimmy Carter and Ronald Reagan. During his tenure with the DEA, undercover agents were able to infiltrate the infamous operation of Nicky Barnes - the powerful heroin kingpin known as "Mr. Untouchable" - and secure his arrest.

Bensinger graduated from Phillips Exeter Academy. After graduation from Yale University, he worked as a General sales manager with the Brunswick Corporation (1958–1968) and with the Illinois Attorney General among other positions. In 1982, Bensinger became president and CEO of Bensinger, DuPont & Associates in Chicago, established 1982. He died on February 11, 2025, at the age of 88.

== Awards ==
Bensinger was inducted as a Laureate of The Lincoln Academy of Illinois and awarded the Order of Lincoln (the State's highest honor) by the Governor of Illinois in 1998 in the area of Government.

Government offices
Preceded by Henry S. Dogin (Acting)	Administrator of the Drug Enforcement Administration; 1976–1981	Succeeded by Francis M. Mullen
