= Administrator of the Drug Enforcement Administration =

United States government position

- Seal of the Drug Enforcement Administration

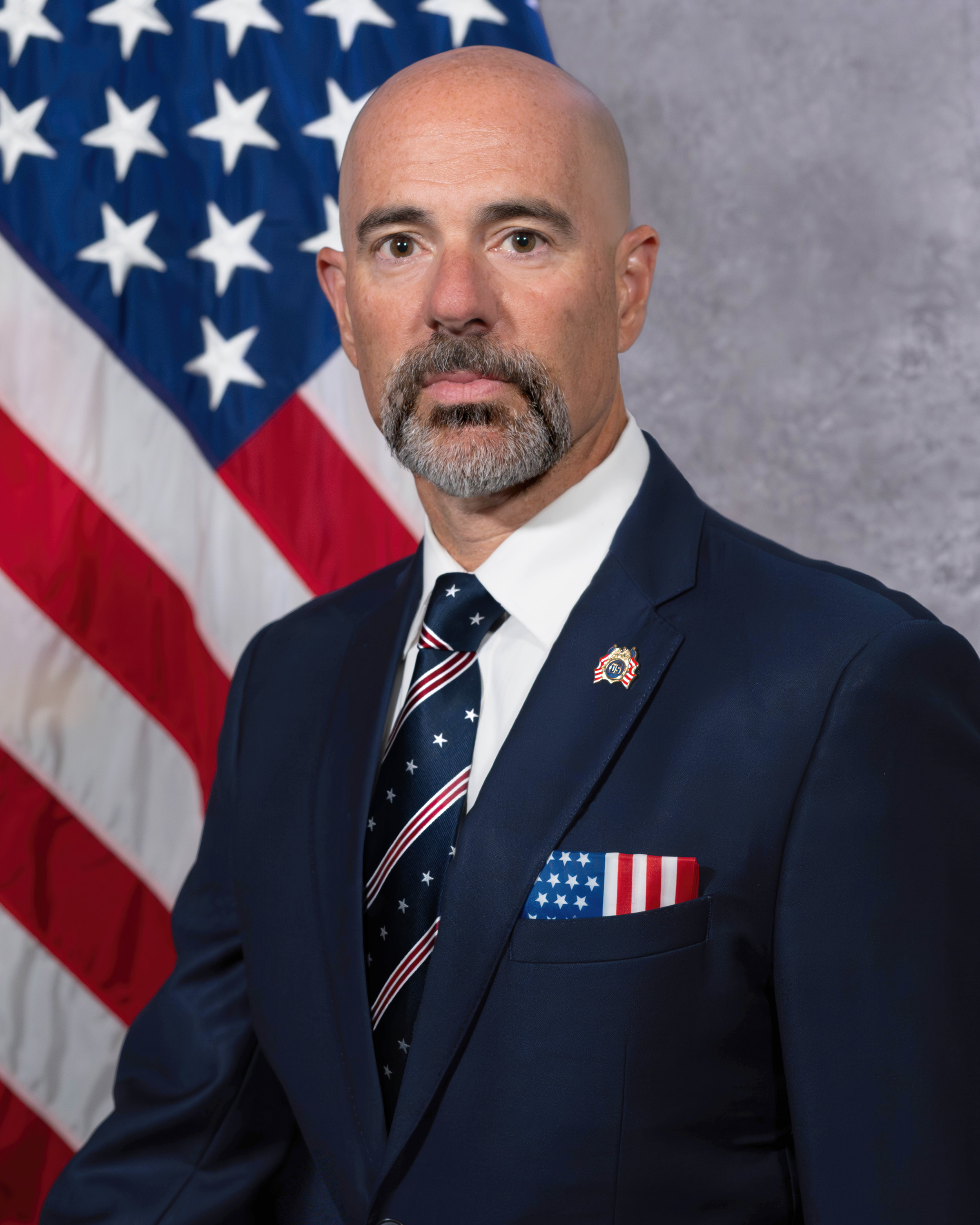
- Incumbent; Terry Cole since July 24, 2025
- Drug Enforcement Administration
- Reports to: United States Attorney General
- Appointer: The president with Senate advice and consent
- Term length: No fixed term
- Inaugural holder: John R. Bartels Jr.

The administrator of the Drug Enforcement Administration is the head of the Drug Enforcement Administration, a United States federal law enforcement agency under the United States Department of Justice, tasked with combating drug trafficking and distribution within the United States.

The administrator is appointed by the president of the United States and confirmed by the U.S. Senate. The administrator reports to the attorney general through the deputy attorney general. The administrator is assisted by a deputy administrator, the chief of operations, the chief inspector, and three assistant administrators (for the operations support, intelligence, and human resources divisions). Other senior staff include the chief financial officer and the chief counsel. The administrator and deputy administrator are the only presidentially appointed personnel in the DEA; all other DEA officials are career government employees.

== List of administrators ==
Unnumbered rows denote acting commissioners.

No.	Image	Name (birth–death)	Term of office		Appointed by (term)
No.	Image	Name (birth–death)	Start of term	End of term	Appointed by (term)
–		John R. Bartels Jr.	July 1, 1973	October 4, 1973	Richard Nixon
1		John R. Bartels Jr.	October 4, 1973	May 30, 1975	Richard Nixon
–		Henry S. Dogin	May 30 1975	Jan 23, 1976	Gerald Ford
–		Peter B. Bensinger	Jan 23, 1976	Feb 23, 1976	Gerald Ford
2		Peter B. Bensinger	Feb 23, 1976	Jul 10, 1981	Gerald Ford
–		Francis M. Mullen, Jr.	Jul 10, 1981	Nov 10, 1983	Ronald Reagan
3		Francis M. Mullen, Jr.	Nov 10, 1983	Mar 1, 1985	Ronald Reagan
–		John C. Lawn	Mar 1, 1985	Jul 26, 1985	Ronald Reagan
4		John C. Lawn	Jul, 1985	Mar 23, 1990	Ronald Reagan
–		Terrence M. Burke	Mar 23, 1990	Aug 13, 1990	George H. W. Bush
5		Robert C. Bonner	Aug 13, 1990	Oct 31, 1993	George H. W. Bush
–		Stephen H. Greene	Nov 1, 1993	Apr 1994	Bill Clinton
6		Thomas A. Constantine	Apr 1994	Jul 1, 1999	Bill Clinton
–		Donnie R. Marshall	Jul 2, 1999	Jun 19, 2000	Bill Clinton
7		Donnie R. Marshall	Jun 19, 2000	Jun 20, 2001	Bill Clinton
–		William B. Simpkins	Jul 3, 2001	Aug 7, 2001	George W. Bush
8		Asa Hutchinson	Aug 8, 2001	Jan 23, 2003	George W. Bush
9		Karen Tandy	Sep 17, 2003	Nov 10, 2007	George W. Bush
–		Michele Leonhart	Nov 10, 2007	Dec 22, 2010	George W. Bush
10		Michele Leonhart	Dec 22, 2010	May 14, 2015	Barack Obama
–		Chuck Rosenberg	May 18, 2015	Oct 1, 2017	Barack Obama
–		Robert W. Patterson	Oct 2, 2017	Jul 2, 2018	Donald Trump
–		Uttam Dhillon	Jul 2, 2018	May 18, 2020	Donald Trump
–		Timothy Shea	May 19, 2020	Jan 20, 2021	Donald Trump
–		D. Christopher Evans	Jan 20, 2021	June 28, 2021	Joe Biden
11		Anne Milgram	June 28, 2021	January 20, 2025	Joe Biden
–		Derek S. Maltz	January 20, 2025	May 2, 2025	Donald Trump
–		Robert Murphy	May 2, 2025	July 24, 2025	Donald Trump
12		Terry Cole	July 24, 2025	Present	Donald Trump
