= Office of Drug Abuse Law Enforcement =

Justice Department agency

Law enforcement agency overview
- Formed: 1972
- Dissolved: 1973
- Superseding Law enforcement agency: Drug Enforcement Administration
- Type: Federal law enforcement
- Jurisdiction: United States
- Status: Defunct
- Headquarters: United States Department of Justice
- Parent department: United States Department of Justice

Executive Order 11641 establishing the ODALE

The Office of Drug Abuse Law Enforcement (ODALE) was a Justice Department agency that Richard Nixon established in January 1972, headed by Myles Ambrose. The office was chiefly a tool for the federal government to assist local government in enforcing drug laws and oblige drug addicts to undergo rehabilitation. In July 1973, ODALE was consolidated, along with several other agencies, into the newly established Drug Enforcement Administration.

== Sources ==
- The Quest for Drug Control by David F. Musto, Pamela Korsmeyer
- PBS Frontline:Thirty Years of America's Drug War
