= Myles Ambrose =

American lawyer (1926–2014)

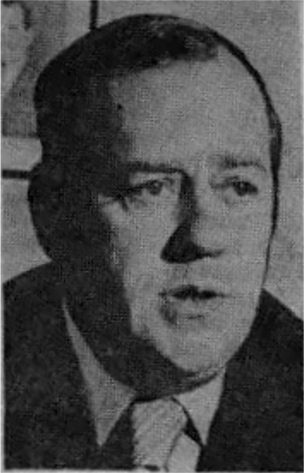
- Born: July 21, 1926; New York City, U.S.
- Died: June 3, 2014 (aged 87); Leesburg, Virginia, U.S.
- Education: Manhattan College; New York Law School
- Occupations: Lawyer, government official
- Political party: Republican Party
- Spouses: Elaine Miller; Joan Fitzpatrick; Lorraine Genovese
- Children: 3 sons, 3 daughters and 3 stepsons, 2 stepdaughters

Myles Joseph Ambrose (July 21, 1926 – June 3, 2014) was an American lawyer and United States federal government official. He served as the Commissioner of Customs under President Richard M. Nixon and paved the way for the establishment of the Drug Enforcement Administration.

== Early life ==
Myles Ambrose was born on July 21, 1926, in The Bronx, New York. His father, Arthur Ambrose, was a stockbroker on Wall Street. His mother, Ann Campbell, was a singer.

Ambrose was educated at the New Hampton School. He received his bachelor's degree in business administration from Manhattan College in 1948 and his law degree from New York Law School in 1952.

== Career ==
Ambrose started his career as a lawyer in New York City. He served as an assistant United States Attorney for the Southern District of New York from 1954 to 1957. He joined the United States Department of the Treasury in 1957, when he was appointed as chief coordinator of law enforcement and he prosecuted gang members. From 1960 to 1963, he served as the executive director of the Waterfront Commission of New York Harbor, where he prosecuted organized crime figures. He returned to legal practice in Washington, D.C., in 1963.

In 1969, Ambrose was appointed as the Commissioner of Customs under President Richard M. Nixon. Under his leadership, he oversaw the implementation of Operation Intercept, which consisted in searching vehicles entering the United States from Mexico. The program was discontinued within weeks; instead, the Mexican police was expected to search for illicit drugs in cars driving into U.S. soil. Meanwhile, it was Ambrose who promoted the use of dogs to look for drugs like heroin and marijuana. In 1971, he successfully completed the seizure of 200 pounds of pure heroin entering the United States in three batches. In January 1972, he became the director of the Office of Drug Abuse Law Enforcement (ODALE), a drug enforcement agency tasked primarily with the U.S. federal government aiding local drug enforcement. He proposed the creation of the more encompassing Drug Enforcement Administration in 1973.

Ambrose returned to legal practise in Washington, D.C., upon retiring from the federal government. He served on the inaugural committee of the Reagan-Bush campaign in 1980. He served as the chairman of the board of Daytop, a drug addiction treatment organization.

== Personal life and death ==
With his first wife, Elaine Miller, he had three sons and three daughters.[2] After she died in 1975, he married Joan Fitzpatrick, but he later divorced.[2] At the time of his death he was married to Lorraine Genovese. He wed Lorraine Genovese, a mother of three sons and two daughters, in 1994.[2] He attended Mass at St. Theresa Catholic Church in Ashburn, Virginia.[2] He resided in Lansdowne, Virginia and later Leesburg, Virginia, where he died of a congestive heart failure at the age of 87.[1][2][3]
