= Dylan Maltz =

American lacrosse player (born 1994)

Personal information
- Born: November 1994 (age 31) Port Jefferson, New York, United States
- Height: 5 ft 8 in (173 cm)
- Weight: 185 lb (84 kg; 13 st 3 lb)

Sport
- Position: Attack

Dylan Maltz (born November 1994) is a professional American lacrosse player. He once signed with the Philadelphia Wings in the National Lacrosse League. Maltz played college lacrosse for Syracuse University and University of Maryland as an attackman.

== College career ==
Maltz was recruited out of high school. He started playing for the Syracuse Orange men's lacrosse team in 2014. He played in a total of six games during his time with Syracuse recording 3 goals and one assist.

Following his freshman year at Syracuse, Maltz transferred to University of Maryland. As a sophomore, Maltz played 18 games, totaling 16 points on 11 goals and five assists. As a junior, Maltz recorded 29 goals and 9 assists in 20 games, totaling a career-high of 38 points.

In 2017, Maltz scored two goals and added an assist in the NCAA Division I men's lacrosse championship game against Ohio State University helping the Maryland Terrapins to a 9-6 championship victory. Maltz finished his college career with 72 goals, 21 assists and 56 ground balls.

== Professional career ==
Maltz previously played in Major League Lacrosse and the Premier Lacrosse League. From 2018 to 2020, he scored 18 goals and recorded 2 assists during the 11 games he played for Charlotte Hounds and Whipsnakes LC.

In March 2021, Maltz joined the National lacrosse league when he signed with the Philadelphia Wings.
