= Sandra Segal Ikuta =

American judge (1954–2025)

Sandra Ikuta
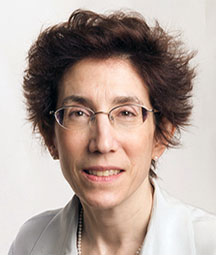

Senior Judge of the United States Court of Appeals for the Ninth Circuit
- In office November 7, 2025 – December 7, 2025

Judge of the United States Court of Appeals for the Ninth Circuit
- In office June 23, 2006 – November 7, 2025
- Appointed by: George W. Bush
- Preceded by: James R. Browning
- Succeeded by: Eric Tung

Personal details
- Born: Sandra Caroline Segal; June 24, 1954 Los Angeles, California, U.S.
- Died: December 7, 2025 (aged 71)
- Party: Republican
- Spouse: Edward Ikuta
- Education: University of California, Berkeley (BA); Columbia University (MS); University of California, Los Angeles (JD)

Sandra Caroline Segal Ikuta (June 24, 1954 – December 7, 2025) was a United States circuit judge of the United States Court of Appeals for the Ninth Circuit.

== Background ==
Ikuta was born and raised in Los Angeles. She received her Bachelor of Arts degree at the University of California, Berkeley in 1976, having previously attended Stanford University for two years. Ikuta received a Master of Science degree in journalism from Columbia University in 1978. From 1978 to 1985, she was a writer and editor for many magazines and organizations which include Guilford Press, City National Bank, Unique Publications, and Disney Channel Magazine.

She then attended the UCLA School of Law, where she was an editor of the UCLA Law Review. She graduated in 1988 with a Juris Doctor degree and Order of the Coif honors. Ikuta clerked for Ninth Circuit Judge Alex Kozinski from 1988 to 1989 and for United States Supreme Court Justice Sandra Day O'Connor from 1989 to 1990. She became an associate of the law firm O’Melveny & Myers in 1990 and went on to become a partner in 1997. At the time of her nomination, Ikuta had been general counsel of the California Resources Agency since January 2004, "trying to protect natural resources and open space and preserve agricultural land." She was also an alternate director of the Pacific Forest and Watershed Lands Stewardship Council.

Ikuta was married to Edward Ikuta, and was a member of the Republican Party. She died at the age of 71 on December 7, 2025, having suffered from pancreatic cancer for about three years.

=== Federalist Society ===
Ikuta was an active member of The Federalist Society, a conservative and libertarian organization which holds panels, debates, and discussions, and she was known to attend their national events.

=== Federal judicial service ===
Ikuta was nominated to the United States Court of Appeals for the Ninth Circuit by President George W. Bush on February 8, 2006, to fill the seat vacated by Judge James R. Browning, who assumed senior status in 2000. Previously, Carolyn Kuhl had been nominated to that position, but she had been filibustered by Senate Democrats for a year until December 2004 when she withdrew her nomination. Ikuta worked alongside her former boss, Judge Alex Kozinski, for whom she clerked. He testified on her behalf at the Senate Judiciary Committee hearing on her nomination. Ikuta was voted unanimously out of the Senate Judiciary Committee on May 26, 2006, and the U.S. Senate confirmed her nomination on June 19, 2006, by an 81–0 vote. She received her commission on June 23, 2006. On March 17, 2025, it was announced that Ikuta would take senior status upon confirmation of a successor. Her judicial service terminated upon her death on December 7, 2025.

=== Statistics ===
Ikuta sat on 26 en banc panels between December 2014 and August 2020. During that time, Ikuta was the en banc court's most frequent dissenter. The judges most likely to agree with Ikuta were Judges Callahan and Bea, while the judges most likely to disagree with her were Judges Thomas, McKeown, and W. Fletcher.

== Notable cases ==
Ikuta's first published opinion on the Ninth Circuit was United States v. Baldrich, issued on December 27, 2006.

She wrote the Dukes v. Wal-Mart dissent in the Ninth Circuit, with reasoning that largely ended up being adopted by the Supreme Court.

In May 2017, Ikuta dissented when the narrowly divided en banc circuit found that the United States District Court for the Southern District of California's policy of indiscriminately shackling criminal defendants in all pretrial hearings violated the Constitution's Due Process Clause. In March 2018, the circuit's judgment was vacated by a unanimous Supreme Court of the United States.

=== City of Los Angeles v. Barr (Sanctuary Cities) ===
On July 12, 2019, in City of Los Angeles v. Barr, the United States Court of Appeals for the Ninth Circuit overturned a nationwide injunction issued in 2018, thus upholding preferential treatment in awarding community policing grants to cities that cooperate with immigration authorities. In the opinion, Ikuta wrote, "Cooperation relating to enforcement of federal immigration law is in pursuit of the general welfare, and meets the low bar of being germane to the federal interest in providing the funding to "address crime and disorder problems, and otherwise... enhance public safety... one of the main purposes for which" the grant is intended. In her dissent, Judge Kim Wardlaw wrote, "[The Department of Justice's] decision to implement both the illegal immigration focus area and the Cooperation Certification is foreclosed by the text, structure, and purpose of the Community Policing Act."

=== State of California v. Alex Azar ===
On February 24, 2020, Ikuta wrote the majority opinion upholding the Trump Administration rule withholding Title X funding from health-care providers that perform, promote, or support abortion with patients. The en banc Ninth Circuit sided with the government by a 7–4 vote. The majority acknowledged they knew that the gag rule's main purpose was to stop abortions; it nevertheless remained constitutional. The majority relied on the Supreme Court precedent Rust v. Sullivan, which upheld a nearly identical rule during the presidency of Ronald Reagan. Ikuta was joined by Senior Judge Edward Leavy and Judges Jay Bybee, Consuelo Callahan, Milan Smith, Eric Miller, and Kenneth K. Lee. Leavy was appointed by President Ronald Reagan, Bybee, Callahan, Ikuta, and Smith by President George W. Bush, and Miller and Lee by President Trump.

=== John Doe v. San Diego Unified School District ===
On December 4, 2021, Ikuta dissented when a 2–1 majority declined to block San Diego Unified School District's requirement that students be vaccinated by December 20.

== See also ==
- List of law clerks for the eighth seat of the Supreme Court of the United States

Legal offices
Preceded by James R. Browning	Judge of the United States Court of Appeals for the Ninth Circuit; 2006–2025	Succeeded by Eric Tung
