= Walter Lyndon Pope =

American judge (1889–1969)

Senior Judge of the United States Court of Appeals for the Ninth Circuit
- In office April 1, 1961 – March 27, 1969

Chief Judge of the United States Court of Appeals for the Ninth Circuit
- In office February 1, 1959 – August 6, 1959
- Preceded by: Albert Lee Stephens Sr.
- Succeeded by: Richard Harvey Chambers

Judge of the United States Court of Appeals for the Ninth Circuit
- In office March 1, 1949 – April 1, 1961
- Appointed by: Harry S. Truman
- Preceded by: Francis Arthur Garrecht
- Succeeded by: James R. Browning

Personal details
- Born: Walter Lyndon Pope; January 26, 1889 Valparaiso, Indiana, U.S.
- Died: March 27, 1969 (aged 80) San Mateo, California, U.S.
- Party: Democratic
- Education: University of Nebraska–Lincoln (AB); University of Chicago Law School (JD)

Walter Lyndon Pope (January 26, 1889 – March 27, 1969) was a United States circuit judge of the United States Court of Appeals for the Ninth Circuit.

== Education and career ==
Born in Valparaiso, Indiana, Pope received an Artium Baccalaureus degree from the University of Nebraska–Lincoln in 1909 and a J.D. degree from the University of Chicago Law School in 1912. He was in private practice in Lincoln, Nebraska from 1912 to 1916. He was an assistant professor of law for the University of Nebraska–Lincoln from 1913 to 1916. He was a professor of law for the University of Montana from 1916 to 1948. He was in private practice in Missoula, Montana from 1917 to 1949. He was a member of the Montana House of Representatives in 1923 and was a Democrat. He was a special assistant to the Attorney General of the United States from 1937 to 1941.

== Federal judicial service ==
Pope was nominated by President Harry S. Truman on February 14, 1949, to a seat on the United States Court of Appeals for the Ninth Circuit vacated by Judge Francis Arthur Garrecht. He was confirmed by the United States Senate on February 25, 1949, and received his commission on March 1, 1949. He served as Chief Judge from February 1, 1959, to August 6, 1959, and a member of the Judicial Conference of the United States in 1959. He assumed senior status on April 1, 1961. His service terminated on March 27, 1969, due to his death in a hospital in San Mateo, California. At the time of his death, he resided in Burlingame, California.

Legal offices
Preceded by Francis Arthur Garrecht	Judge of the United States Court of Appeals for the Ninth Circuit; 1949–1961	Succeeded by James R. Browning
Preceded by Albert Lee Stephens Sr.	Chief Judge of the United States Court of Appeals for the Ninth Circuit; 1959	Succeeded by Richard Harvey Chambers
