= J. Clifford Wallace =

American federal judge (born 1928)

Clifford Wallace
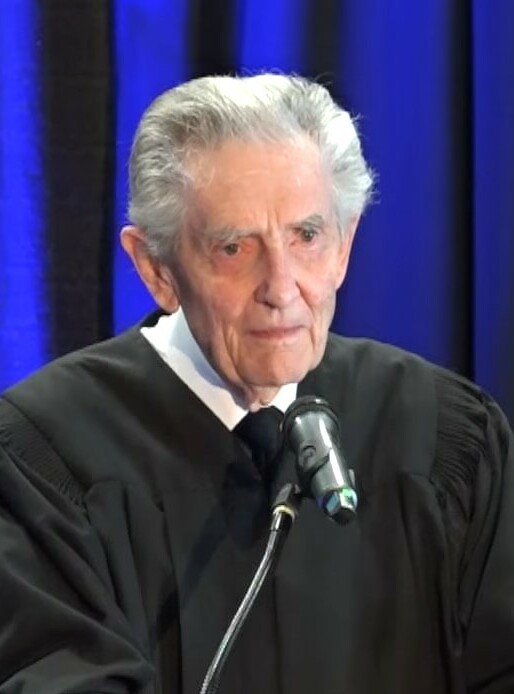

Senior Judge of the United States Court of Appeals for the Ninth Circuit
- Incumbent
- Assumed office April 8, 1996

Chief Judge of the United States Court of Appeals for the Ninth Circuit
- In office January 31, 1991 – April 8, 1996
- Preceded by: Alfred Goodwin
- Succeeded by: Procter Ralph Hug Jr.

Judge of the United States Court of Appeals for the Ninth Circuit
- In office June 28, 1972 – April 8, 1996
- Appointed by: Richard Nixon
- Preceded by: James Marshall Carter
- Succeeded by: Kim McLane Wardlaw

Judge of the United States District Court for the Southern District of California
- In office October 16, 1970 – July 14, 1972
- Appointed by: Richard Nixon
- Preceded by: Seat established
- Succeeded by: William Benner Enright

Personal details
- Born: John Clifford Wallace; December 11, 1928 (age 97) San Diego, California, U.S.
- Education: San Diego State University (BA); University of California, Berkeley (LLB)

John Clifford Wallace (born December 11, 1928) is an American lawyer and jurist serving as a senior United States circuit judge of the U.S. Court of Appeals for the Ninth Circuit. He was appointed to the Ninth Circuit in 1972 by President Richard Nixon and was its chief judge from 1991 to 1996. He was a U.S. district judge of the U.S. District Court for the Southern District of California from 1970 to 1972.

== Education and career ==
Wallace was born on December 11, 1928, in San Diego, California. He served in the United States Navy from 1946 to 1949, attaining the rank of Second Class Petty Officer. He later graduated from San Diego State University in 1952 with a Bachelor of Arts and from the UC Berkeley School of Law in 1955 with a Bachelor of Laws. He was in private practice in San Diego from 1955 to 1970, at the law firm of Gray Cary Ames & Frye.

== Federal judicial service ==
Wallace was nominated by President Richard Nixon on October 7, 1970, to the United States District Court for the Southern District of California, to a new seat authorized by 84 Stat. 294. He was confirmed by the United States Senate on October 13, 1970, and received his commission on October 16, 1970. His service terminated on July 14, 1972, due to his elevation to the Ninth Circuit.

Wallace was nominated by Nixon on May 22, 1972, to a seat on the United States Court of Appeals for the Ninth Circuit vacated by James Marshall Carter. He was confirmed by the Senate on June 28, 1972, and received his commission on June 28, 1972. Wallace served as Chief Judge of the Ninth Circuit from 1991 to 1996. He assumed senior status on April 8, 1996. As a senior judge, Wallace has a reduced caseload, but he continues to hear cases in the Ninth Circuit, and he sits by designation from time to time as a visiting judge on other federal appellate courts.

When Potter Stewart announced he was stepping down from the Supreme Court in June 1981, Wallace was initially believed to be the favorite for Stewart's seat, but he lost out to Sandra Day O'Connor because Ronald Reagan had made a campaign promise to appoint the first woman to the Court. Wallace was apparently not considered for the next vacancy after the departure of Chief Justice Warren Burger five years later, but after the retirement of Lewis F. Powell Jr. in 1987 and the rejection of Robert Bork, Wallace reemerged as a possible high court nominee. Alongside Pasco Bowman II of the Eighth Circuit, however, Wallace was viewed by the Senate's Democratic majority as the most controversial amongst the thirteen or fourteen nominees proposed after Bork was rejected. Wallace's devout Mormon faith, strong support for the death penalty based upon the Bible, and belief that strict separation of church and state was not mandated by the Constitution were all viewed unfavourably by Republican officials aware of a requirement for Democratic support and consultation. Democrats themselves voiced strong objection to Wallace as an excessively ideological candidate akin to Bork, and he was further hindered by his 1984 ruling that rejected an appeal by female athletes to include longer-distance races for women in the Summer Olympics. Powell's seat ultimately went to Anthony Kennedy, who was then serving alongside Wallace on the Ninth Circuit.

On July 31, 2018, Wallace wrote an opinion ruling against the sheriff Joe Arpaio. He was joined by Judges Susan P. Graber and Marsha Berzon. On October 22, 2019, Wallace wrote a 2–1 opinion that prohibited religious exemptions for businesses that did not want to participate in the healthcare system due to support of contraceptives. Wallace was joined by Graber, over the dissent of Judge Andrew Kleinfeld.

== Personal life ==
Wallace is a member of the Church of Jesus Christ of Latter-day Saints, and is the first member of the church to serve as chief judge of the United States Court of Appeals. On April 24, 2025, Brigham Young University conferred on Wallace an honorary doctorate of law and public service. Wallace has been widowed twice. As of 2025, he and his wife, Dixie Jenee Robison Wallace, jointly have 15 children, 51 grandchildren, and 38 great-grandchildren.

== See also ==
- List of United States federal judges by longevity of service

== Sources ==
- J. Clifford Wallace Papers, MSS 7730; 20th Century Western and Mormon Manuscripts; L. Tom Perry Special Collections, Harold B. Lee Library, Brigham Young University.
- Appearances on C-SPAN

Legal offices
New seat	Judge of the United States District Court for the Southern District of California; 1970–1972	Succeeded by William Benner Enright
Preceded by James Marshall Carter	Judge of the United States Court of Appeals for the Ninth Circuit; 1972–1996	Succeeded by Kim McLane Wardlaw
Preceded by Alfred Goodwin	Chief Judge of the United States Court of Appeals for the Ninth Circuit; 1991–1996	Succeeded by Procter Ralph Hug Jr.
