= Albert Lee Stephens Sr. =

American judge (1874–1965)

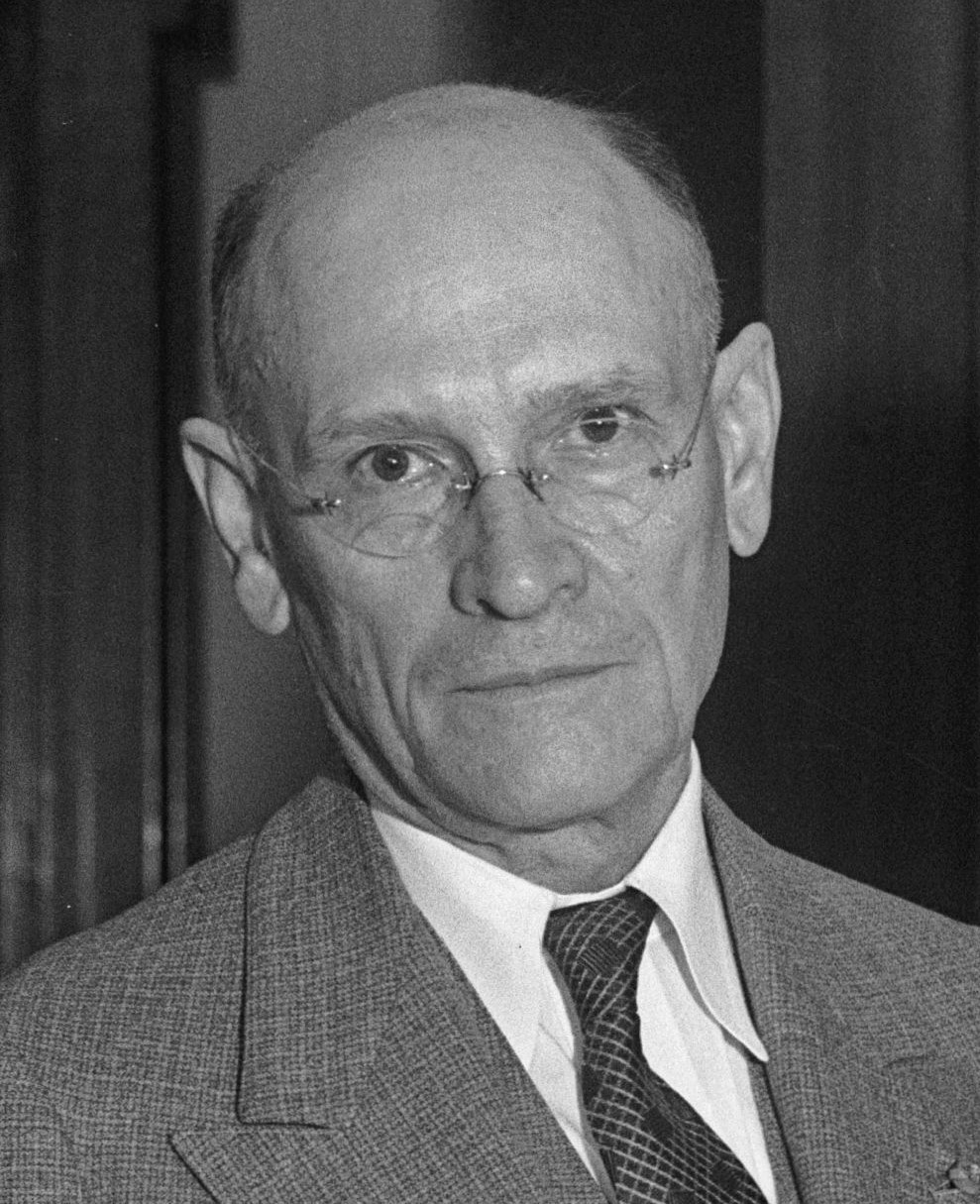
- Stephens in 1935

Senior Judge of the United States Court of Appeals for the Ninth Circuit
- In office January 25, 1961 – January 15, 1965

Chief Judge of the United States Court of Appeals for the Ninth Circuit
- In office July 3, 1957 – February 1, 1959
- Preceded by: William Denman
- Succeeded by: Walter Lyndon Pope

Judge of the United States Court of Appeals for the Ninth Circuit
- In office June 18, 1937 – January 25, 1961
- Appointed by: Franklin D. Roosevelt
- Preceded by: Seat established by 50 Stat. 64
- Succeeded by: Ben C. Duniway

Judge of the United States District Court for the Southern District of California
- In office August 24, 1935 – June 21, 1937
- Appointed by: Franklin D. Roosevelt
- Preceded by: Seat established by 49 Stat. 508
- Succeeded by: Ralph E. Jenney

Presiding Justice of the California Court of Appeal, Second District, Division Two
- In office 1933–1935
- Appointed by: Governor James Rolph
- Preceded by: Lewis R. Works
- Succeeded by: Charles S. Crail

Personal details
- Born: Albert Lee Stephens; January 25, 1874 State Line City, Indiana, U.S.
- Died: January 15, 1965 (aged 90)
- Education: USC Gould School of Law (LLB) read law

Albert Lee Stephens Sr. (January 25, 1874 – January 15, 1965) was a United States circuit judge of the United States Court of Appeals for the Ninth Circuit from 1937 to 1965. Prior to that, he was a United States district judge of the United States District Court for the Southern District of California and the Presiding Justice of the California Court of Appeal, Second District, Division Two.

== Education and career ==
Born in State Line City, Indiana, Stephens read law in 1899 and received a Bachelor of Laws from the USC Gould School of Law in 1903. He was in private practice of law in Los Angeles, California from 1899 to 1906. He was a Justice of the Peace in Los Angeles from 1906 to 1910. He was in private practice from 1910 to 1911. He was a civil service commissioner for State of California from 1911 to 1913. He was city attorney of Los Angeles from 1913 to 1919. He was in private practice from 1919 to 1920. He was a Judge of the Superior Court of Los Angeles County from 1919 to 1932. He was appointed by Governor James Rolph as an associate justice of the District Court of Appeal, succeeding Ira F. Thompson and serving from 1932 to 1933 and then serving as Presiding Justice of that court from 1933 to 1935.

== Federal judicial service ==
Stephens was nominated by President Franklin D. Roosevelt on August 21, 1935, to the United States District Court for the Southern District of California, to a new seat created by 49 Stat. 508. He was confirmed by the United States Senate on August 23, 1935, and received his commission on August 24, 1935. His service was terminated on June 21, 1937, due to his elevation to the Ninth Circuit.

Stephens was nominated by President Roosevelt on June 8, 1937, to the United States Court of Appeals for the Ninth Circuit, to a new seat created by 50 Stat. 64. He was confirmed by the Senate on June 15, 1937, and received his commission on June 18, 1937. He served as Chief Judge from July 3, 1957, to February 1, 1959, and as a member of the Judicial Conference of the United States from 1957 to 1958. He assumed senior status on January 25, 1961. His service was terminated on January 15, 1965, due to his death.

== Other endeavors ==
Albert Lee Stephens Sr. owned Four Star Theater from 1932 to 1978.

== Family ==
Stephens's son, Albert Lee Stephens Jr., was also a federal judge in California.

== See also ==
- Robert S. MacAlister, subject of a Stephens decision allowing him to serve as a Los Angeles City Council member, 1934–39

Legal offices
Preceded by Lewis R. Works	Presiding Justice of the California Court of Appeal, Second District, Division Two; 1933–1935	Succeeded by Charles S. Crail
Preceded by Seat established by 49 Stat. 508	Judge of the United States District Court for the Southern District of California; 1935–1937	Succeeded by Ralph E. Jenney
Preceded by Seat established by 50 Stat. 64	Judge of the United States Court of Appeals for the Ninth Circuit; 1937–1961	Succeeded by Ben C. Duniway
Preceded by William Denman	Chief Judge of the United States Court of Appeals for the Ninth Circuit; 1957–1959	Succeeded by Walter Lyndon Pope
