= Frank H. Rudkin =

American judge (1864–1931)

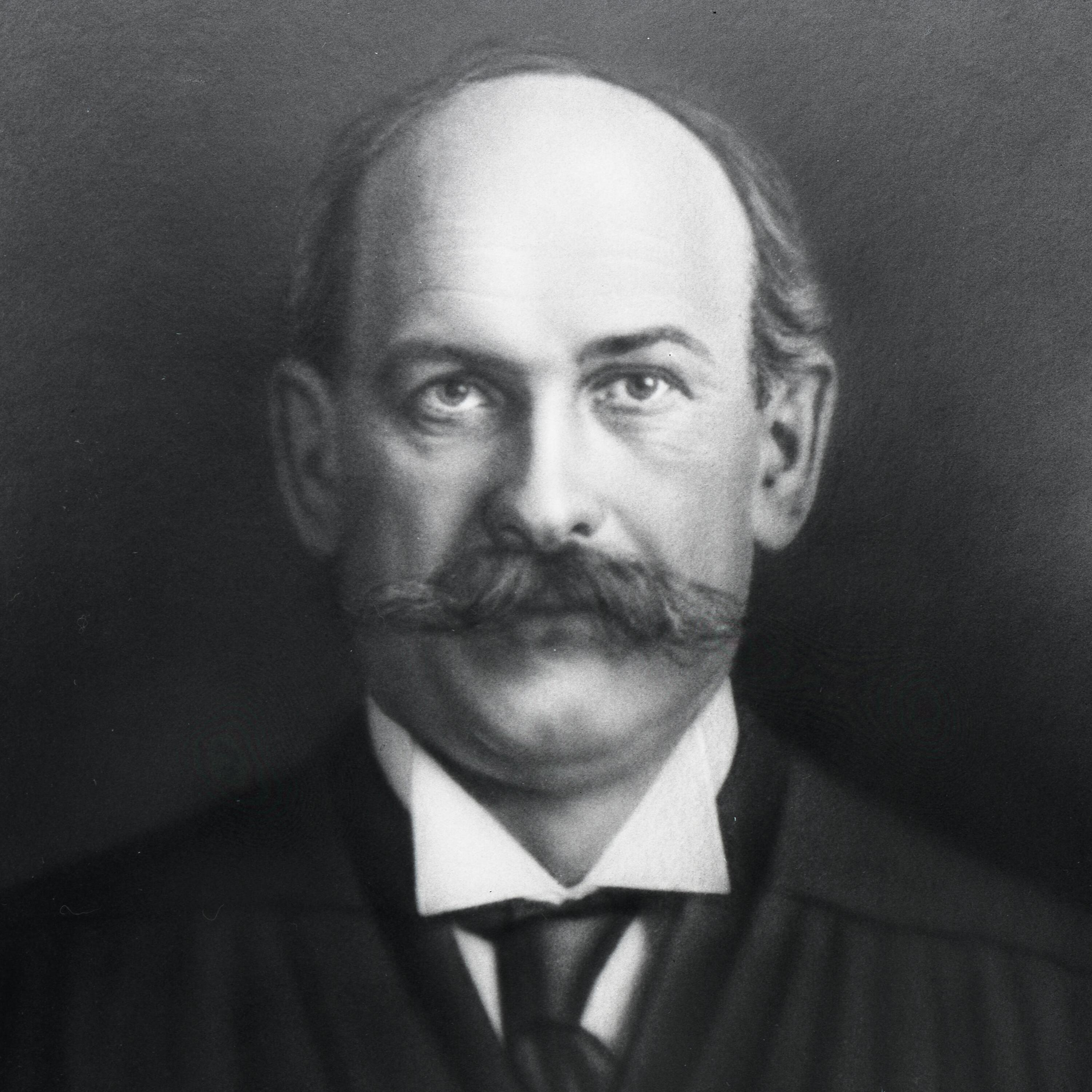
- Rudkin c. 1905

Judge of the United States Court of Appeals for the Ninth Circuit
- In office January 9, 1923 – May 3, 1931
- Appointed by: Warren G. Harding
- Preceded by: William W. Morrow
- Succeeded by: Francis Arthur Garrecht

Judge of the United States District Court for the Eastern District of Washington
- In office January 31, 1911 – January 17, 1923
- Appointed by: William Howard Taft
- Preceded by: Edward Whitson
- Succeeded by: J. Stanley Webster

Personal details
- Born: Frank H. Rudkin; April 23, 1864 Vernon Township, Ohio, U.S.
- Died: May 3, 1931 (aged 67)
- Education: Washington and Lee University read law

Frank H. Rudkin (April 23, 1864 – May 3, 1931) was a United States circuit judge of the United States Court of Appeals for the Ninth Circuit and previously was a United States district judge of the United States District Court for the Eastern District of Washington.

== Education and career ==
Born in Vernon Township, Trumbull County, Ohio, Rudkin attended Washington and Lee University and read law in 1887 to enter the bar. He was in private practice in Ellensburg, Washington Territory (State of Washington from November 11, 1889) from 1887 to 1890, and in North Yakima (now Yakima), Washington from 1890 to 1901. He was a Judge of the Superior Court of Washington from 1901 to 1905, and of the Supreme Court of Washington from 1905 to 1911.

== Federal judicial service ==
Rudkin was nominated by President William Howard Taft on January 17, 1911, to a seat on the United States District Court for the Eastern District of Washington vacated by Judge Edward Whitson. He was confirmed by the United States Senate on January 31, 1911, and received his commission the same day. His service terminated on January 17, 1923, due to his elevation to the Ninth Circuit.

Rudkin was nominated by President Warren G. Harding on January 5, 1923, to a seat on the United States Court of Appeals for the Ninth Circuit vacated by Judge William W. Morrow. He was confirmed by the Senate on January 9, 1923, and received his commission the same day. His service was terminated on May 3, 1931, due to his death from heart disease at St. Joseph's Hospital, San Francisco.

== Notable cases ==
Territory of Hawaii v. Anduha, 48 F.2d 171 (9th Cir. 1931) -This case involved an appeal by the Territory of Hawaii concerning "the validity of a statute of the territory of Hawaii providing that any person who shall habitually loaf, loiter, and/or idle upon any public street or highway or in any public place shall be guilty of a misdemeanor, and punished as therein provided."

Speaking for the court (which upheld the judgment), Judge Rudkin stated in part: "It is a matter of common knowledge, of which we must take judicial cognizance, that the majority of mankind spend a goodly part of their waking hours in whiling or idling the time away, and much of that time is spent on public streets and highways and in public places. Daylight saving laws have been enacted in order that those employed during the day may have more time at their disposal for recreation and pleasure; more time to idle, loiter, and loaf. On our streets daily are seen hundreds and even thousands of idle men who have nothing to do and no place to go, through no fault of their own, and are we to add to their misfortunes by declaring them lawbreakers and criminals?"

== Sources ==
Legal offices
Preceded by Edward Whitson	Judge of the United States District Court for the Eastern District of Washington; 1911–1923	Succeeded by J. Stanley Webster
Preceded by William W. Morrow	Judge of the United States Court of Appeals for the Ninth Circuit; 1923–1931	Succeeded by Francis Arthur Garrecht
