= Procter Ralph Hug Jr. =

American judge (1931–2019)

- Hug in 2000

Senior Judge of the United States Court of Appeals for the Ninth Circuit
- In office January 1, 2002 – November 30, 2017

Chief Judge of the United States Court of Appeals for the Ninth Circuit
- In office April 8, 1996 – November 30, 2000
- Preceded by: J. Clifford Wallace
- Succeeded by: Mary M. Schroeder

Judge of the United States Court of Appeals for the Ninth Circuit
- In office September 15, 1977 – January 1, 2002
- Appointed by: Jimmy Carter
- Preceded by: Ben C. Duniway
- Succeeded by: Jay Bybee

Personal details
- Born: Procter Ralph Hug Jr. March 11, 1931 Reno, Nevada, U.S.
- Died: October 17, 2019 (aged 88) Reno, Nevada, U.S.
- Education: University of Nevada, Reno (BS); Stanford University (LLB)

Procter Ralph Hug Jr. (March 11, 1931 – October 17, 2019) was a United States circuit judge of the United States Court of Appeals for the Ninth Circuit.

== Education and career ==
Hug was born in Reno, Nevada.,

He received a Bachelor of Science degree from the University of Nevada, Reno in 1953 as a member of Alpha Tau Omega fraternity. He was a lieutenant in the United States Navy from 1954 to 1955. He received a Bachelor of Laws from Stanford Law School in 1958, entering private practice in Reno until 1977.

He was a deputy state attorney general of Nevada, and was a general counsel to the Nevada University System from 1972 to 1976. He was a civilian aide to the United States Secretary of the Army in 1977.

== Federal judicial service ==
On August 29, 1977, Hug was nominated by President Jimmy Carter to a seat on the United States Court of Appeals for the Ninth Circuit vacated by Ben C. Duniway. Hug was confirmed by the United States Senate on September 15, 1977, and received his commission the same day. He served as chief judge from 1996 to 2000. He assumed senior status on January 1, 2002. He retired from active service on November 30, 2017.

Hug died on October 17, 2019.

== Sources ==
Legal offices
Preceded by Ben C. Duniway	Judge of the United States Court of Appeals for the Ninth Circuit; 1977–2002	Succeeded by Jay Bybee
Preceded by J. Clifford Wallace	Chief Judge of the United States Court of Appeals for the Ninth Circuit; 1996–2000	Succeeded by Mary M. Schroeder
