= Richard Harvey Chambers =

American judge (1906–1994)

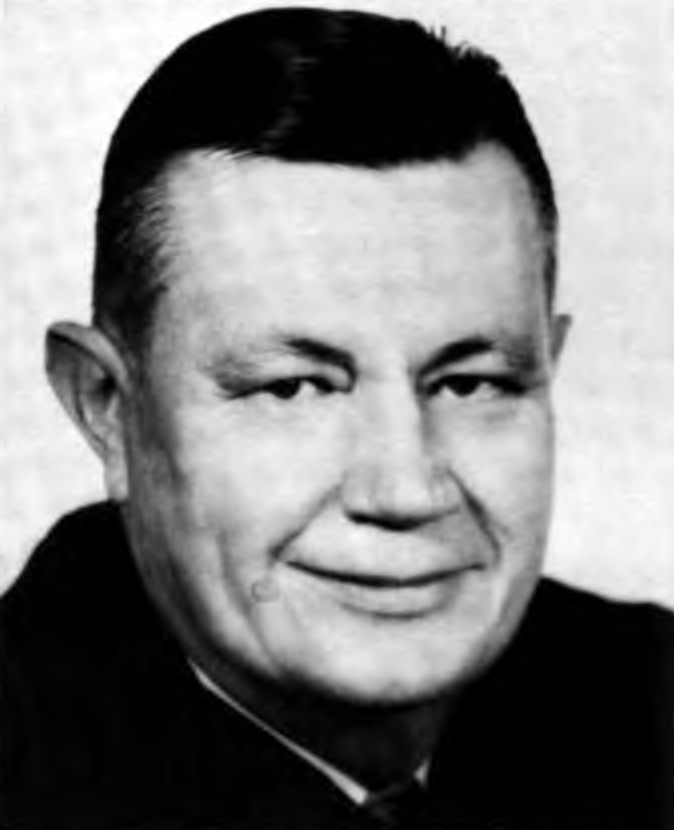

Senior Judge of the United States Court of Appeals for the Ninth Circuit
- In office December 31, 1976 – October 21, 1994

Chief Judge of the United States Court of Appeals for the Ninth Circuit
- In office August 6, 1959 – July 1, 1976
- Preceded by: Walter Lyndon Pope
- Succeeded by: James R. Browning

Judge of the United States Court of Appeals for the Ninth Circuit
- In office April 30, 1954 – December 31, 1976
- Appointed by: Dwight D. Eisenhower
- Preceded by: Seat established by 68 Stat. 871
- Succeeded by: Thomas Tang

Personal details
- Born: November 7, 1906 Danville, Illinois, U.S.
- Died: October 21, 1994 (aged 87)
- Education: University of Arizona (AB); Stanford Law School (LLB)

Richard Harvey Chambers (November 7, 1906 – October 21, 1994) was a United States circuit judge of the United States Court of Appeals for the Ninth Circuit.

== Education and career ==
Chambers was born to William Rock and Lida Chambers in Danville, Illinois. Three months later, the family moved to Solomonville, Arizona, where his father worked as clerk of the district court of Graham County. In 1924, Chambers graduated as class president from Safford High School in Safford, Arizona, and then earned a Bachelor of Arts degree in economics from the University of Arizona in 1929, where he served as editor-in-chief of the school newspaper. Chambers received a Bachelor of Laws from Stanford Law School in 1932. He practiced law in Tucson, Arizona from 1932 to 1942, and from 1945 to 1954. He served as a United States Army Air Corps Major from 1942 to 1945.

== Federal judicial service ==
Chambers was nominated by President Dwight D. Eisenhower on April 6, 1954, to the United States Court of Appeals for the Ninth Circuit, to a new seat created by 68 Stat. 871. He was confirmed by the United States Senate on April 27, 1954, and received his commission on April 30, 1954. He served as Chief Judge and as a member of the Judicial Conference of the United States from August 6, 1959 to July 1, 1976, the longest-serving chief judge in the history of the Ninth Circuit and the "longest-tenured chief of any circuit, ever." He assumed senior status on December 31, 1976. His service was terminated on October 21, 1994, due to his death.

== Honor and legacy ==
The United States Court of Appeals Building in Pasadena, California, bears his name; but four other historic courthouses in the Ninth Circuit—in San Francisco, Portland, Tacoma, and San Diego—also owe "their survival and resurrection" to Chambers' "vision and tenacity."

== Personality ==
Chambers "had something of a coarse exterior" as well as a "slow, low, and deliberate speaking style" that he himself described as "halting speech." The gruff appearance only lightly concealed "a mischievous sense of humor." For instance, Chambers frequently wrote memoranda to his colleagues under the pseudonym, "Tom Chambers," the name of his palomino horse. Chambers dedicated himself to writing judicial prose that was succinct, folksy, even quirky, believing that in writing accessible decisions, his court could more effectively create legal precedent, provide popular accountability, and produce a usable historical record.

Legal offices
Preceded by Seat established by 68 Stat. 871	Judge of the United States Court of Appeals for the Ninth Circuit; 1954–1976	Succeeded by Thomas Tang
Preceded by Walter Lyndon Pope	Chief Judge of the United States Court of Appeals for the Ninth Circuit; 1959–1976	Succeeded by James R. Browning
