= Francis Arthur Garrecht =

American judge (1870–1948)

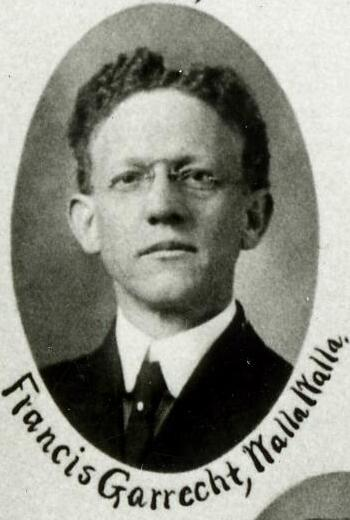
- Garrecht in 1911

Judge of the United States Court of Appeals for the Ninth Circuit
- In office May 19, 1933 – August 11, 1948
- Appointed by: Franklin D. Roosevelt
- Preceded by: Frank H. Rudkin
- Succeeded by: Walter Lyndon Pope

Personal details
- Born: Francis Arthur Garrecht; September 11, 1870 Walla Walla, Washington Territory
- Died: August 11, 1948 (aged 77)
- Education: read law

Francis Arthur Garrecht (September 11, 1870 – August 11, 1948) was a United States circuit judge of the United States Court of Appeals for the Ninth Circuit.

== Education and career ==
Born in Walla Walla, Washington Territory, Garrecht read law to enter the bar in 1894. He was in private practice in Walla Walla, State of Washington from 1895 to 1913, also serving as a member of the Washington House of Representatives from 1911 to 1913. He was the United States Attorney for the Eastern District of Washington from 1914 to 1921. He was a lecturer on waters for Gonzaga University from 1911 to 1924. He returned to private practice in Spokane, Washington from 1922 to 1932, and was a legal adviser to Governor of Washington Clarence D. Martin in 1933.

== Federal judicial service ==
On May 4, 1933, Garrecht was nominated by President Franklin D. Roosevelt to a seat on the United States Court of Appeals for the Ninth Circuit vacated by Judge Frank H. Rudkin. Garrecht was confirmed by the United States Senate on May 16, 1933, and received his commission on May 19, 1933, serving in that capacity until his death on August 11, 1948. He was a member of the Conference of Senior Circuit Judges (now the Judicial Conference of the United States) from 1945 to 1947.

== Sources ==
Legal offices
Preceded by Frank H. Rudkin	Judge of the United States Court of Appeals for the Ninth Circuit; 1933–1948	Succeeded by Walter Lyndon Pope
