= Richard H. Chambers United States Court of Appeals =

- Vista del Arroyo Hotel and Bungalows
- U.S. National Register of Historic Places
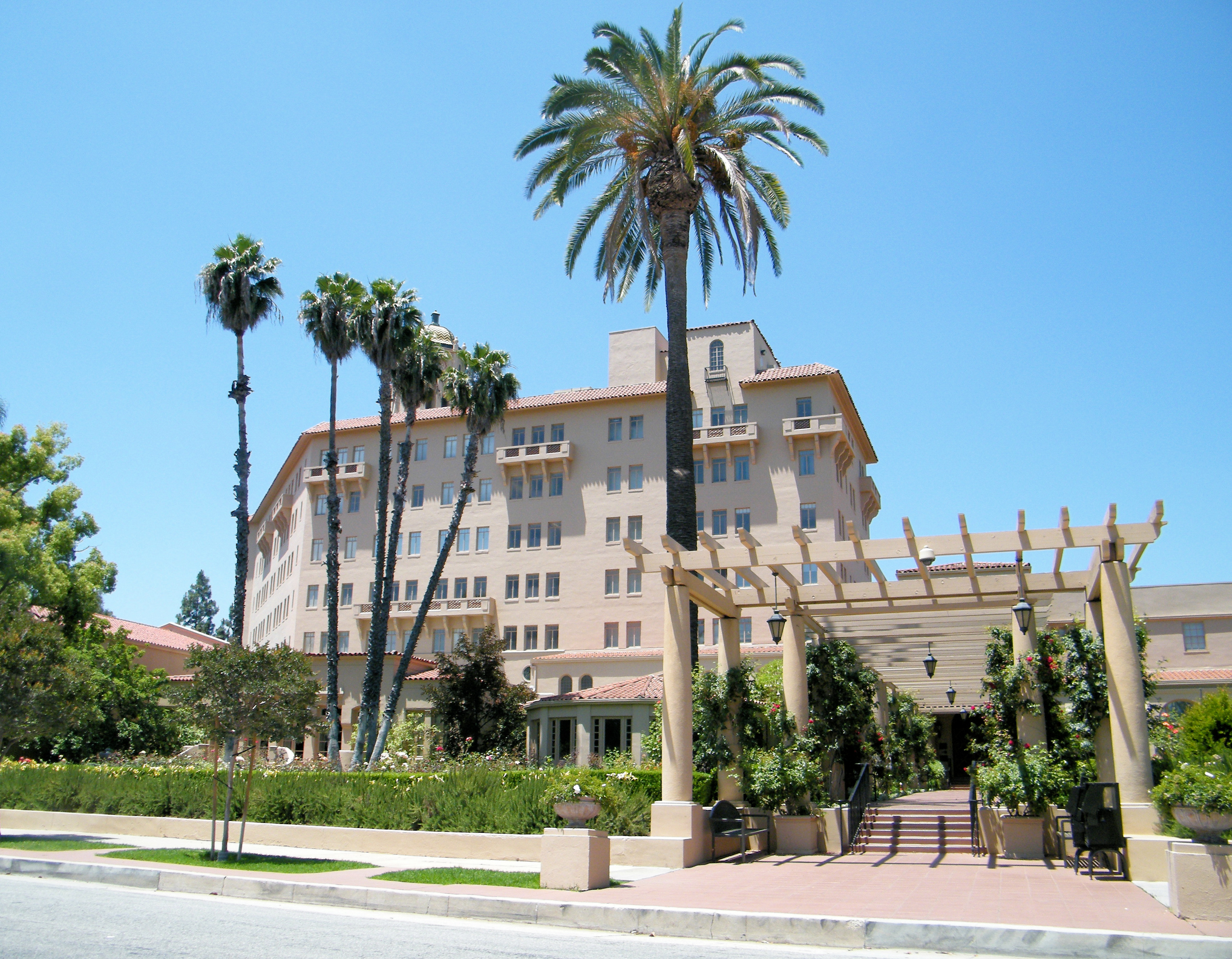
- Richard H. Chambers U.S. Court of Appeals, June 2010

- Location within the Los Angeles metropolitan area Location within California Location within the United States
- Location: 125 S. Grand Ave., Pasadena, California
- Coordinates: 34°8′39″N 118°9′43″W
- Area: 13 acres (5.3 ha)
- Built: 1920; 106 years ago
- Architects: Marston & Van Pelt, et al.
- Architectural style: Spanish Colonial Revival
- NRHP reference No.: 81000157
- Added to NRHP: April 02, 1981

The Richard H. Chambers U.S. Court of Appeals is a historic building originally constructed as a Spanish Colonial Revival style resort known as the Vista del Arroyo Hotel and Bungalows located at Pasadena in Los Angeles County, California. During World War II, it served as the McCornack General Hospital, and was thereafter in use as a general-purpose federal government building for several decades. It now serves as a courthouse of the United States Court of Appeals for the Ninth Circuit.

== Building history ==
Richard H. Chambers U.S. Court of Appeals Building is set on the crest of a steep hill overlooking the Arroyo Seco River and dominates the view from across the Arroyo. Originally built as a hotel during the late stages of Pasadena's great resort hotel age, the main building was constructed in two sections—the two-story north wing, in 1920, and the six-story bell tower with flanking wings, in 1930.

The site's resort history dates to 1882, when Emma C. Bangs opened the original La Vista del Arroyo Hotel, a two-story, wood-frame building, and series of small cottages. In 1919, hotel tycoon Daniel M. Linnard, associated with such elegant Pasadena hotels as the Huntington and Green, purchased La Vista del Arroyo with the vision of developing the property into an opulent resort. Linnard commissioned the architectural firm of Marston & Van Pelt to design a large, two-story Spanish Colonial Revival hotel to replace the original structure. Once the popularity of the Vista had been established, select guests also built bungalows on the property.

In 1926, Linnard sold the resort to former business partner H.O. Comstock. Comstock hired architect George H. Wiemeyer to redesign the hotel and add a grand six-story addition that consisted of a central bell tower and flanking wings set at an angle. The new Vista opened in 1931 with iridescent color, entertainment, and social gaiety. In 1936, Linnard repurchased the property and hired landscape architect Verner S. Anderson to improve the hotel's grounds by designing formal gardens and adding fountains, tennis courts, and a swimming pool.

In 1943 the U.S. War Department acquired the hotel complex and converted it into the McCornack General Hospital and offices for the U.S. Army. The hospital was named after Brigadier General Condon C. McCornack, Command Surgeon of the Western Defense Command. In 1949, the hospital was closed and the old hotel, under the care of the U.S. General Services Administration (GSA), housed a variety of Federal agencies from 1951 to 1974.

In 1981 the Vista del Arroyo was placed in the National Register of Historic Places and GSA began design work to restore the building as the southern seat of the Ninth Circuit Court of Appeals. In 1995, the building was renamed to honor Judge Richard Harvey Chambers, whose concept it was to bring a Federal courthouse to Pasadena.

== Architecture ==
The courthouse is the largest of several buildings adjacent to a residential district at the western edge of Pasadena. The old hotel was constructed primarily in two sections: a two-story steel and wood frame section built in 1920–21, and a six-story reinforced concrete portion built in 1930–1931. The buildings were joined together at the original main entrance, their first floors aligning on the interior to form a continuous first level. The two sections form a U-shaped plan, oriented to face the Colorado Street Bridge. Only the northernmost portion of the 1920 building remains—its southern half and central campanile (bell tower) were removed for the 1930s addition.

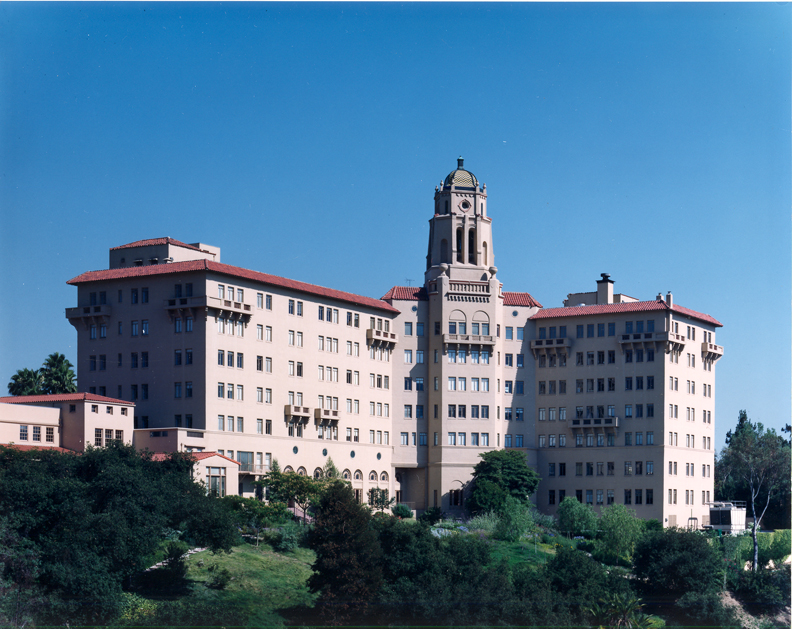

Both the 1920 and the 1930 sections were designed in the Spanish Colonial Revival style with a skillful interplay of stucco walls, arched openings, and terracotta tile roof. The exterior ornamental detailing is very simple, with bracketed balconies, an arcaded ground level, and Spanish Colonial Revival features such as circular windows and twisted balusters. The most prominent component of the building, the 1930 tower, is richly embellished and capped with a dome covered with patterned dual-toned tiles.

Between 1920 and 1937, four architects played significant roles in designing the Vista del Arroyo. Sylvanus Marston and Garrett Van Pelt were responsible for the plans for the 1920 hotel. In 1921, architect Myron Hunt transformed the Vista Hotel into one of the premier resorts in Pasadena, designing several of the hotel's original bungalows. Pasadena architect George H. Wiemeyer designed the elegant six-story addition in 1930.

The first floor of the interior was richly ornamented. At the hotel entrance, visitors strolled through a vine-covered pergola to a lobby embellished with decorative pilasters, freestanding columns, and plaster moldings. From the elaborate Morning Room and Sunset Room, guests viewed the gardens and outdoor activities as the day progressed.

A number of cottages, including the elaborate Maxwell House, remain in privately owned portions of the original property. On the 7.2 acres (29,000 m^{2}) still owned by the Government, GSA continues to maintain the original paths, patios, and gardens.

During the 1980s, GSA restored the building exterior, grounds, and ornamental interior spaces to their original appearance under the design direction of J. Rudy Freeman of Neptune & Thomas, earning awards from the American Institute of Architects and National Endowment for the Arts. Suspended ceilings were removed and original plaster decorations recreated in the Spanish Room (now a courtroom), Dining Room (now a library), Lounge (now offices), Morning Room (now a conference room), and foyers.

The Spanish Room is particularly lavish; its rich detail includes a highly decorative ceiling with large cast-iron grilles and walls with wrought-iron grilles. The original Dining Room features plaster pilasters and columns, wrought-iron light fixtures, large arched window openings, and a beamed ceiling. The elevator lobby and west foyer also retain significant original elements, such as the decorative elevator doors and original glazed-tile risers of the main stair. A reconstructed rose-covered pergola, restored fountain, and colorful plantings are at the entrance to the U.S. Court of Appeals.

== Significant events ==
- 1882: Emma C. Bangs opens a resort hotel called La Vista del Arroyo.
- 1919: Hotel tycoon Daniel M. Linard buys the hotel and hires architects Marston & Van Pelt to replace the wood-frame building with a larger Spanish Colonial Revival structure.
- 1930: Architect George H. Wiemeyer redesigns the hotel with a six-story addition.
- 1936-37: Landscape architect Verner S. Anderson improves the resort by adding formal gardens, fountains, tennis courts, and a large swimming pool.
- 1943-1949: The hotel serves as the War Department's McCornack General Hospital.
- 1951-1974: Various Federal agencies occupy the building. The hotel serves as the venue for Project Vista.
- 1981: Neptune & Thomas begins designing restoration of old Vista to house U.S. Court of Appeals. The building is listed in the National Register of Historic Places.
- 1985: The U.S. General Services Administration reopens the former hotel as a Federal courthouse.

== Building facts ==
- Architects: Sylvanus Marston & Garrett Van Pelt; George H. Wiemeyer; Myron Hunt
- Construction Dates: North wing, 1920; tower and angled wings, 1930; bungalows, 1921–37; Maxwell House, 1929
- Landmark Status: Listed in the National Register of Historic Places
- Location: 125 South Grand Street
- Architectural Style: Spanish Colonial Revival style
- Primary Materials: Reinforced concrete walls dressed with beige stucco and red terra-cotta tile roof
- Prominent Feature: Six-story bell tower

== See also ==
- Yule marble
