= Mary M. Schroeder =

American judge (born 1940)

Mary Schroeder
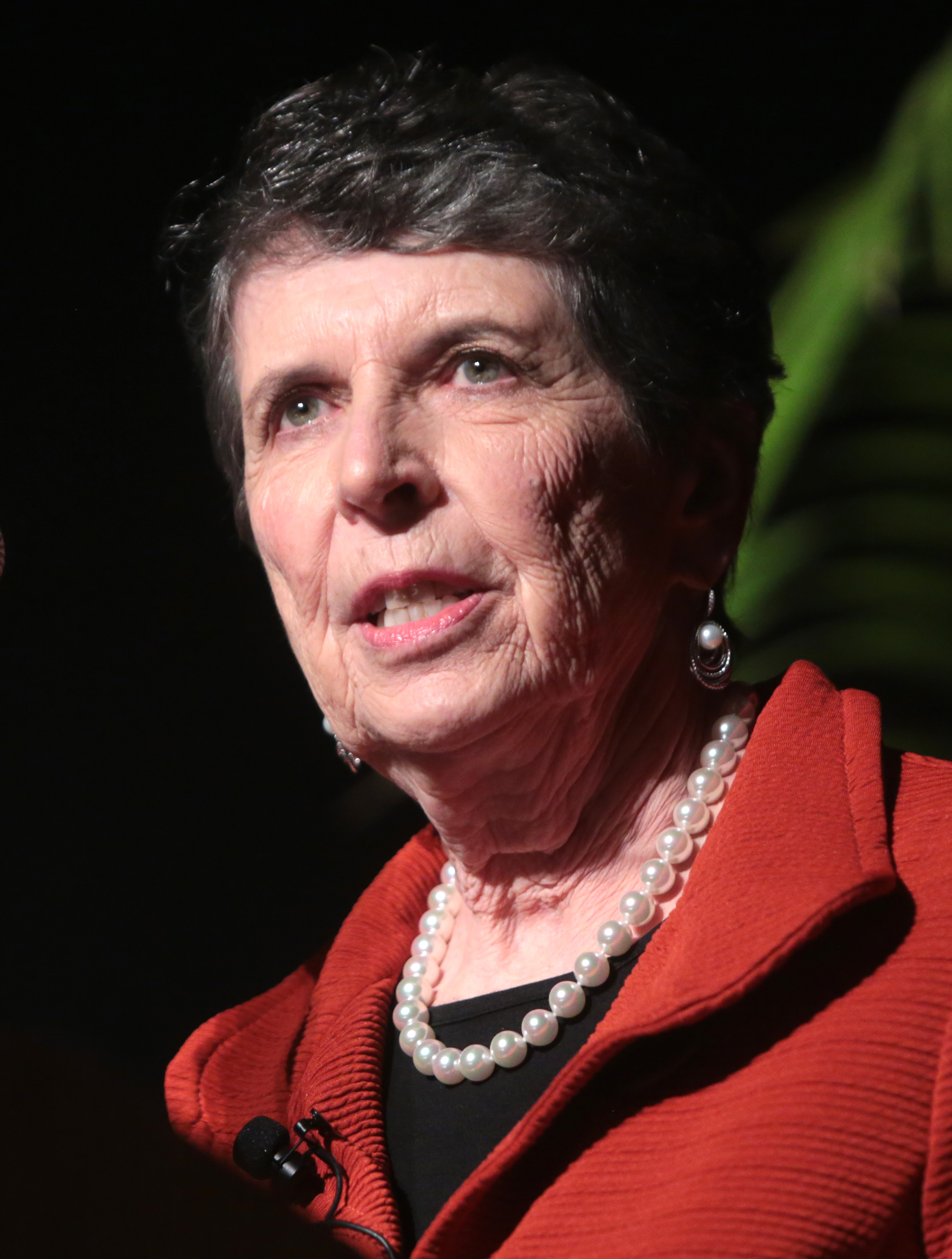
- Schroeder in 2017

Senior Judge of the United States Court of Appeals for the Ninth Circuit
- Incumbent
- Assumed office December 31, 2011

Chief Judge of the United States Court of Appeals for the Ninth Circuit
- In office November 30, 2000 – December 1, 2007
- Preceded by: Procter Ralph Hug Jr.
- Succeeded by: Alex Kozinski

Judge of the United States Court of Appeals for the Ninth Circuit
- In office September 26, 1979 – December 31, 2011
- Appointed by: Jimmy Carter
- Preceded by: Seat established
- Succeeded by: Andrew D. Hurwitz

Personal details
- Born: December 4, 1940 (age 85) Boulder, Colorado, U.S.
- Education: Swarthmore College (BA); University of Chicago (JD)

Mary Murphy Schroeder (née Murphy; born December 4, 1940) is an American attorney and jurist serving as a senior United States circuit judge of the United States Court of Appeals for the Ninth Circuit.

== Early life and education ==
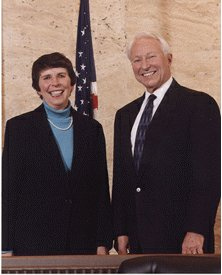
Schroeder with her Ninth Circuit predecessor, Procter Hug (2012)

Born on December 4, 1940, in Boulder, Colorado, Schroeder received her Bachelor of Arts degree from Swarthmore College in 1962 and her J.D. degree from the University of Chicago Law School in 1965, one of six women in her class. She received an honorary Doctor of Laws (Legum Doctor (LL.D.) from Swarthmore in May 2006.

== Career ==
Schroeder practiced as a trial attorney with the United States Department of Justice Civil Division from 1965 until 1969. She served as a law clerk to Justice Jesse Addison Udall of the Arizona Supreme Court in 1970. She joined the law firm of Lewis & Roca in Phoenix, Arizona, in 1971 and became a partner in 1973. She was appointed to the Arizona Court of Appeals in 1975 and served until 1979.

Schroeder was elected to the American Law Institute in 1974 and was elected to the ALI Council in 1993. She served as an Adviser on the Restatement Third of Agency and serves as an adviser on the Restatement Third, The Law of Consumer Contracts and Principles of Government Ethics. She served as president of the National Association of Women Judges in 1998-99.

=== Federal judicial service ===
Schroeder was nominated by President Jimmy Carter on May 3, 1979, to the United States Court of Appeals for the Ninth Circuit, to a new seat authorized by 92 Stat. 1629. She was confirmed by the United States Senate on September 25, 1979, and received her commission on September 26, 1979. She served as the first female chief judge of the Ninth Circuit from 2000 to 2007. She assumed senior status on December 31, 2011.

=== Awards ===
Schroeder has received numerous prestigious awards, including but not limited to:

- the American Law Institute's John Minor Wisdom Award in 2023
- the Arizona State Bar Association's James A. Walsh Outstanding Jurist Award
- the American Bar Association's Margaret Brent Award
- the Joan Dempsey Klein NAWJ Honoree of the Year Award

In addition, the Arizona State University Law School has named two awards after Schroeder:

- the Mary M. Schroeder Public Interest Prize
- the Judge Mary M. Schroeder Federal Practice Award

== Notable cases ==
- The northern spotted owl, a case related to the Endangered Species Act
- The Napster file trading software copyright infringement appeal.
- Hirabayashi v. United States coram nobis in which the opinion authored by Schroeder vacated the infamous convictions of Gordon Hirabayashi for refusing to report to a control center and breaking curfew during the internment of Japanese Americans during World War II
- In CAPEEM v. Torlakson, Schroeder rejected a claim that California schools inaccurately portrayed Hinduism.
- Jespersen v. Harrah's Operating Co. holding an employer's grooming standards that appropriately discriminate by gender (here requiring women to wear makeup to work) are not facially discriminatory under Title VII of the Civil Rights Act of 1964, 42 U.S.C. § 2000e et seq.
- In August 2015, Schroeder found that the United States District Court for the Southern District of California's policy of indiscriminately shackling criminal defendants in all pretrial hearings violated the Constitution's Due Process Clause. Her judgment was affirmed by the narrowly divided circuit en banc, before being vacated by the unanimous Supreme Court of the United States.
- On December 14, 2016, Schroeder in a unanimous opinion upheld California's 10-day waiting period for firearm purchases under the now-abrogated intermediate scrutiny.
- "A Community Voice v. USEPA" (PDF). cdn.ca9.uscourts.gov. May 14, 2021. (May 14, 2021): Schroeder ruled that the EPA failed to properly examine lead standards, and that it must reconsider those standards. Schroeder concluded her opinion by writing "Consistent with our holding in this opinion that the EPA must reconsider the DLHS, we direct the EPA to reconsider the clearance levels as well in the same proceeding. Both sets of standards must work together to effectuate Congress's intent to end the hazards of lead poisoning in our children."

== Personal life ==
She was married to Milton Schroeder (d. 2025), a professor at the Sandra Day O'Connor College of Law, and has two children, Katherine and Caroline.

== See also ==
- List of United States federal judges by longevity of service

Legal offices
New seat	Judge of the United States Court of Appeals for the Ninth Circuit; 1979–2012	Succeeded by Andrew D. Hurwitz
Preceded by Procter Ralph Hug Jr.	Chief Judge of the United States Court of Appeals for the Ninth Circuit; 2000–2007	Succeeded by Alex Kozinski
