= United States Court of Appeals for the Ninth Circuit =

Federal appellate court for the western U.S.

- (9th Cir.)
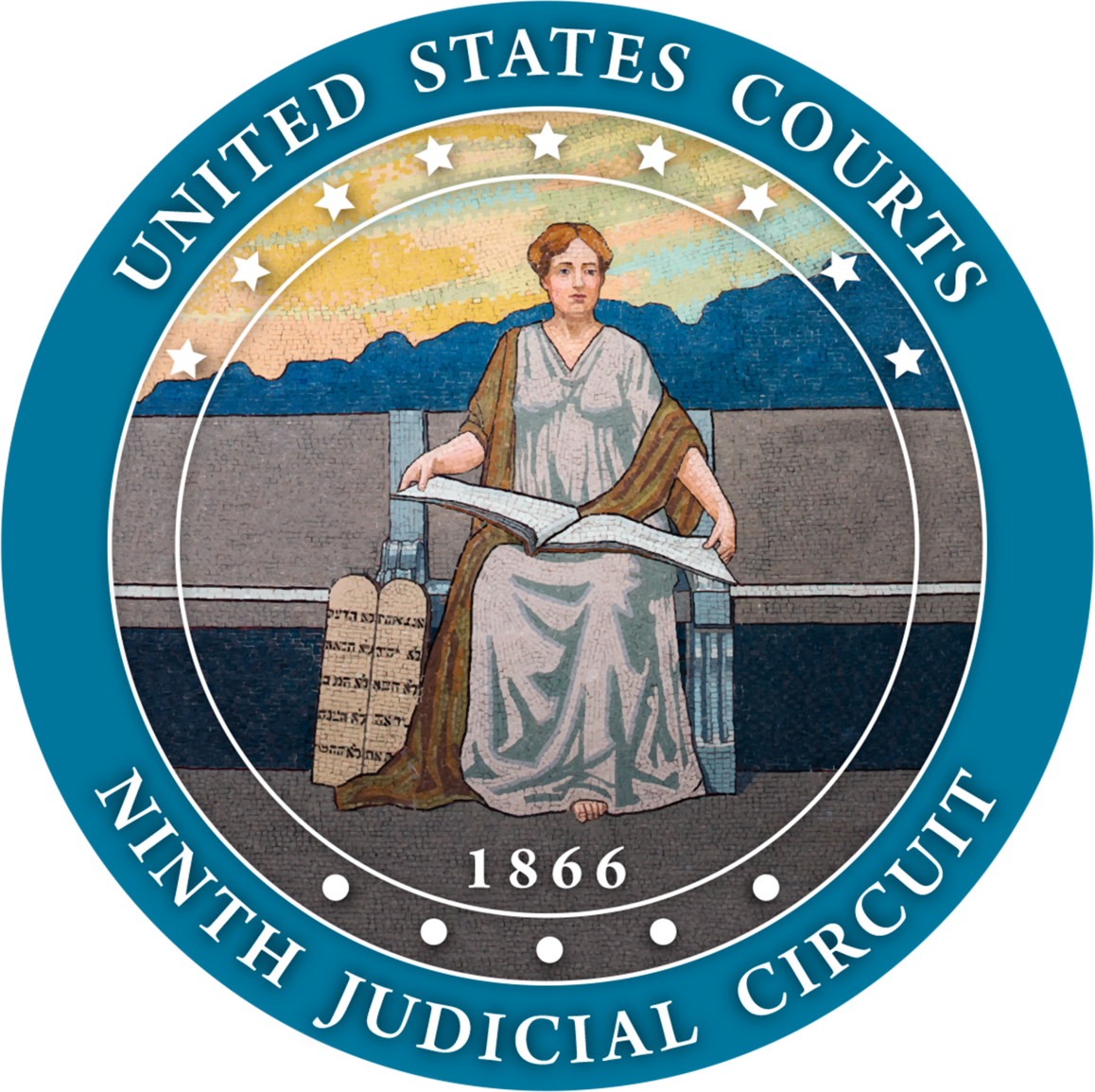

- Location: James R. Browning U.S. Court of Appeals Building (San Francisco, California) More locations: William Kenzo Nakamura U.S. Courthouse (Seattle, Washington); Pioneer Courthouse (Portland, Oregon); Richard H. Chambers U.S. Court of Appeals (Pasadena, California)
- Appeals from: District of Alaska; District of Arizona; Central District of California; Eastern District of California; Northern District of California; Southern District of California; District of Hawaii; District of Idaho; District of Montana; District of Nevada; District of Oregon; Eastern District of Washington; Western District of Washington; District of Guam; District of the Northern Mariana Islands
- Established: March 3, 1891
- Judges: 29
- Circuit Justice: Elena Kagan
- Chief Judge: Mary H. Murguia
- www.ca9.uscourts.gov

The United States Court of Appeals for the Ninth Circuit (in case citations, 9th Cir.) is the largest of the U.S. federal court of appeals. The court is headquartered in San Francisco, California, and has appellate jurisdiction over the U.S. district courts for the following federal judicial districts:

- District of Alaska
- District of Arizona
- Central District of California
- Eastern District of California
- Northern District of California
- Southern District of California
- District of Hawaii
- District of Idaho
- District of Montana
- District of Nevada
- District of Oregon
- Eastern District of Washington
- Western District of Washington

The Ninth Circuit also has appellate jurisdiction over the territorial courts for the District of Guam and the District of the Northern Mariana Islands. Additionally, it sometimes handles appeals that originate from American Samoa, which has no district court and partially relies on the District of Hawaii for its federal cases.

The Ninth Circuit is the largest of the 13 U.S. Courts of Appeals, covering a total of nine states and two territories and with 29 active judgeships. The court's regular meeting places are Seattle (at the William Kenzo Nakamura United States Courthouse), Portland (at the Pioneer Courthouse), San Francisco (at the James R. Browning United States Court of Appeals Building), and Pasadena (at the Richard H. Chambers United States Court of Appeals).

Panels of the court occasionally travel to hear cases in other locations within the circuit. Although the judges travel around the circuit, the court arranges its hearings so that cases from the northern region of the circuit are heard in Seattle or Portland, cases from southern California and Arizona are heard in Pasadena, and cases from northern California, Nevada, Hawaii, and the Pacific territories are heard in San Francisco. Additionally, the court holds yearly sittings in Anchorage and Honolulu. For lawyers who must come and present their cases to the court in person, this administrative grouping of cases helps to reduce the time and cost of travel. Ninth Circuit judges are also appointed by the United States Secretary of the Interior to serve as temporary acting Associate Justices for non-federal appellate sessions at the High Court of American Samoa in Fagatogo.

== History ==
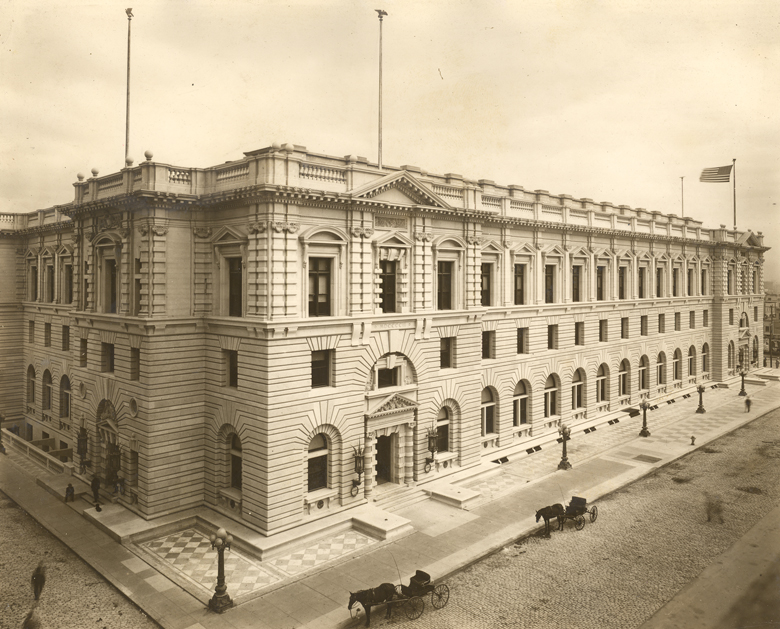
Ninth Circuit Court House in 1905

Year	Jurisdiction	Total population	Pop. as % of nat'l pop.	Number of active judgeships
1891	California, Idaho, Montana, Nevada, Oregon, Washington	2,087,000	3.3%	2
1900	Territory of Hawaii added	2,798,000	3.7%	3
1912	Arizona added	7,415,000 (Note: The population of China is not included in the chart for 1912 or 1940, since the Court for China lacked plenary jurisdiction over China's domestic population, then numbering about 430 million people; the court exercised only extraterritorial jurisdiction over the relatively small number of American citizens in China.)	6.7%	3
1940		11,881,000	9.0%	7
1960	Alaska and Guam added	22,607,000	12.6%	9
1980	Northern Mariana Islands added	37,170,000	16.4%	23
2000		54,575,000	19.3%	28
2007		60,400,000	19.9%	28
2009		61,403,307	19.72%	29
2010		61,742,858	19.99%	29
2020		66,848,869	20.17%	29

The Ninth Circuit's large size is due to the dramatic increases in both the population of the western states and the court's geographic jurisdiction that have occurred since the U.S. Congress created the Ninth Circuit in 1891. The court was originally granted appellate jurisdiction over federal district courts in California, Idaho, Montana, Nevada, Oregon, and Washington. As new states and territories were added to the federal judicial hierarchy in the twentieth century, many of those in the West were placed in the Ninth Circuit: the newly acquired Territory of Hawaii in 1900, Arizona upon its admission to the Union in 1912, the Territory of Alaska in 1948, Guam in 1951, and the Commonwealth of the Northern Mariana Islands in 1977.

The Ninth Circuit also had jurisdiction over certain American interests in China, in that it had jurisdiction over appeals from the United States Court for China during the existence of that court from 1906 through 1943.

However, the Philippines was never under the Ninth Circuit's jurisdiction. Congress never created a federal district court in the Philippines from which the Ninth Circuit could hear appeals. Instead, appeals from the Supreme Court of the Philippines were taken directly to the Supreme Court of the United States.

In 1979, the Ninth Circuit became the first federal judicial circuit to set up a Bankruptcy Appellate Panel as authorized by the Bankruptcy Reform Act of 1978.

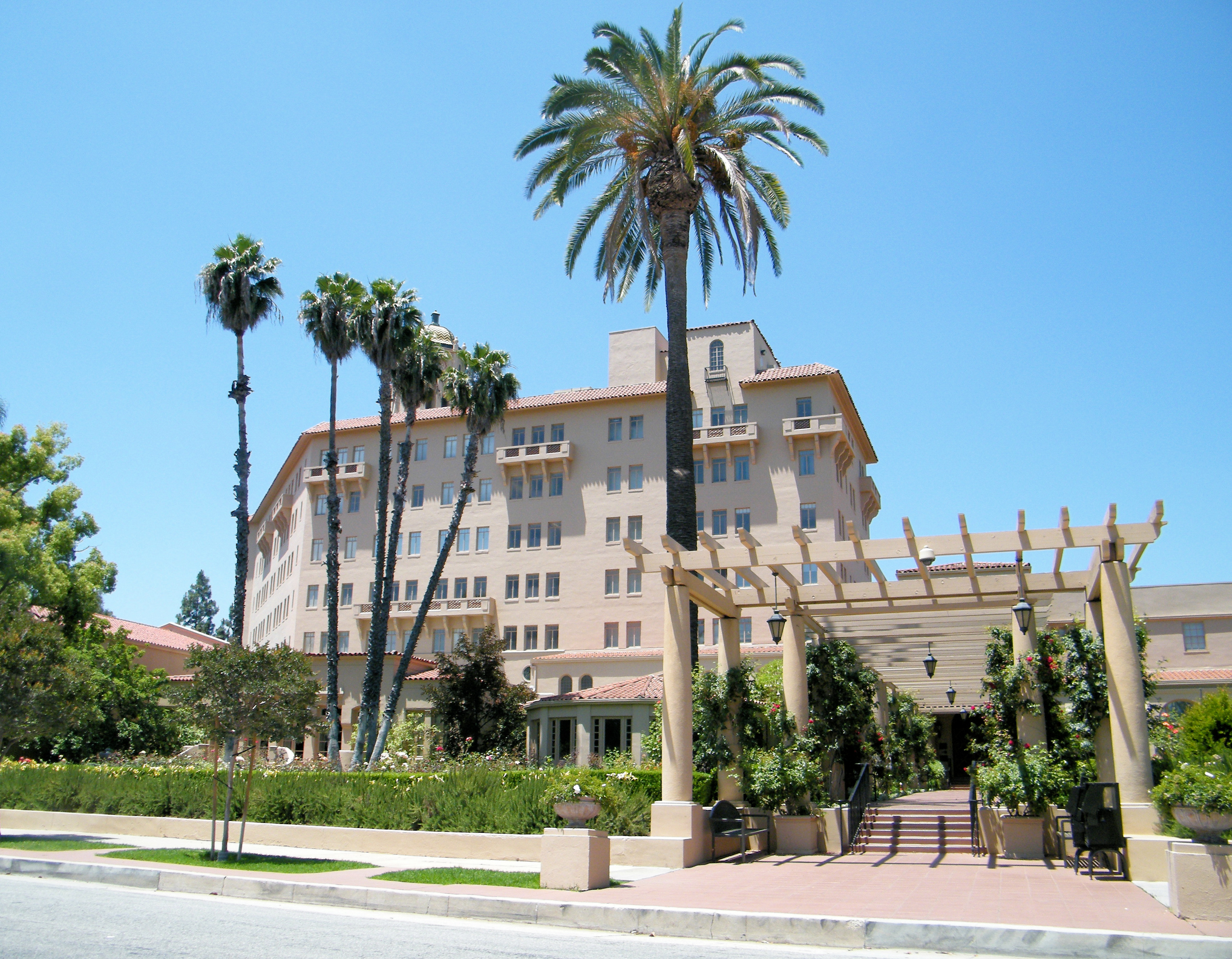
The Richard H. Chambers U.S. Court of Appeals, Pasadena, California

The cultural and political jurisdiction of the Ninth Circuit is just as varied as the land within its geographical borders. In a dissenting opinion in a rights of publicity case involving the Wheel of Fortune star Vanna White, Circuit Judge Alex Kozinski sardonically noted that "[f]or better or worse, we are the Court of Appeals for the Hollywood Circuit." Judges from more remote parts of the circuit note the contrast between legal issues confronted by populous states such as California and those confronted by rural states such as Alaska, Idaho, Montana, and Nevada.

Judge Andrew J. Kleinfeld, who maintained his judicial chambers in Fairbanks, Alaska, wrote in a letter in 1998: "Much federal law is not national in scope....It is easy to make a mistake construing these laws when unfamiliar with them, as we often are, or not interpreting them regularly, as we never do."

== Procedures ==
Cases from United States District Courts within the Ninth Circuit are appealed to the United States Court of Appeals, and that case is reviewed by a three-judge panel in the circuit for which the district court is a part. In the vast majority of cases, the ruling of that three-judge panel is final, unless overruled by the Supreme Court of the United States, which happens in less than 1% of cases. A procedure exists for the review of a ruling made by a three-judge panel by all of the active judges in the circuit, which is called a en banc review. Only about 1.5% of the cases heard by the Ninth Circuit are granted an en banc review, and only 0.24% of cases are decided by en banc review, which is statistically almost as rare as a case being granted certiorari by the Supreme Court. The Ninth Circuit's rules of procedure state that en banc reviews are to be used for only very complex or important cases, or when the court believes there is an especially significant issue at stake, as stated by Rule 35 of the Federal Rules of Appellate Procedure: "An en banc hearing or rehearing is not favored and ordinarily will not be ordered unless: (1) en banc consideration is necessary to secure or maintain uniformity of the court's decisions; or (2) the proceeding involves a question of exceptional importance."

== Criticism ==
=== Rate of overturned decisions ===
From 1999 to 2008, of the Ninth Circuit Court rulings that were accepted for review by the Supreme Court, 20% were affirmed, 19% were vacated, and 61% were reversed; the median reversal rate for all federal appellate courts was 68.29% for the same period. From 2010 to 2015, of the cases it accepted to review, the Supreme Court reversed around 79% of the cases from the Ninth Circuit, ranking its reversal rate third among the circuits; the median reversal rate for all federal circuits for the same time period was around 70 percent.

Some argue the court's high percentage of reversals is illusory, resulting from the circuit hearing more cases than the other circuits. This results in the Supreme Court reviewing a smaller proportion of its cases, letting stand the vast majority of its cases.

However, a detailed study in 2018 reported by Brian T. Fitzpatrick, a law professor at Vanderbilt University, looked at how often a federal circuit court was reversed for every thousand cases it terminated on the merits between 1994 and 2015. The study found that the Ninth Circuit's decisions were reversed at a rate of 2.50 cases per thousand, which was by far the highest rate in the country, with the Sixth Circuit second as 1.73 cases per thousand. Fitzpatrick also noted that the 9th Circuit was unanimously reversed more than three times as often as the least reversed circuits and over 20% more often than the next closest circuit.

=== Size of the court ===
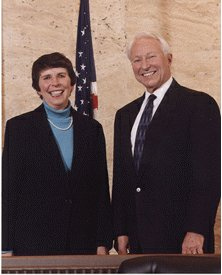
Mary M. Schroeder, when appointed (Nov. 2000) Chief Judge of the Ninth Circuit, with her predecessor, Procter Ralph Hug Jr.

Many commentators have argued that the Ninth Circuit faces several adverse consequences of its large size, such as "unwieldly size, procedural inefficiencies, jurisprudential unpredictability, and unusual en banc process."

Chief among these is the Ninth Circuit's unique rules concerning the composition of an en banc court. In other circuits, en banc courts are composed of all active circuit judges, plus (depending on the rules of the particular court) any senior judges who took part in the original panel decision. By contrast, in the Ninth Circuit it is impractical for 29 or more judges to take part in a single oral argument and deliberate on a decision en masse. The court thus provides for a limited en banc review by the Chief Judge and a panel of 10 randomly selected judges. This means that en banc reviews may not actually reflect the views of the majority of the court and indeed may not include any of the three judges involved in the decision being reviewed in the first place. The result, according to detractors, is a high risk of intracircuit conflicts of law where different groupings of judges end up delivering contradictory opinions. That is said to cause uncertainty in the district courts and within the bar. However, en banc review is a relatively rare occurrence in all circuits and Ninth Circuit rules provide for full en banc review in limited circumstances.

All recently proposed splits would leave at least one circuit with 21 judges, only two fewer than the 23 that the Ninth Circuit had when the limited en banc procedure was first adopted. In other words, after a split at least one of the circuits would still be using limited en banc courts.

In March 2007, Associate Justices Anthony Kennedy and Clarence Thomas testified before a House Appropriations subcommittee that the consensus among the justices of the Supreme Court of the United States was that the Ninth Circuit was too large and unwieldy and should be split.

Congressional officials, legislative commissions, and interest groups have all submitted proposals to divide the Ninth Circuit such as:

- Ninth Circuit Court of Appeals Reorganization Act of 1993, H.R. 3654
- Final Report of the Commission on Structural Alternatives for the Federal Courts of Appeals
- Ninth Circuit Court of Appeals of Reorganization Act of 2003, S. 562
- Ninth Circuit Court of Appeals Judgeship and Reorganization Act of 2003, H.R. 2723
- Ninth Circuit Judgeship and Reorganization Act of 2004, S. 878 (reintroduced as the Ninth Circuit Judgeship and Reorganization Act of 2005, H.R. 211, and co-sponsored by House Majority Leader Tom DeLay)
- Circuit Court of Appeals Restructuring and Modernization Act of 2005, S. 1845
- Circuit Court of Appeals Restructuring and Modernization Act of 2007, S. 525
- Ninth Circuit Court of Appeals Judgeship and Reorganization Act of 2017, H.R. 196

The more recent proposals have aimed to redefine the Ninth Circuit to cover California, Hawaii, Guam, and the Northern Mariana Islands, and to create a new Twelfth Circuit to cover Alaska, Arizona, Idaho, Montana, Nevada, Oregon, and Washington.

== Current composition of the court ==
As of December 7, 2025:

#	Title	Judge	Duty station	Born	Term of service			Appointed by
#	Title	Judge	Duty station	Born	Active	Chief	Senior	Appointed by
94	Chief Judge	Mary H. Murguia	Phoenix, AZ	1960	2011–present	2021–present	—	Obama
79	Circuit Judge	Kim McLane Wardlaw	Pasadena, CA	1954	1998–present	—	—	Clinton
82	Circuit Judge	Ronald M. Gould	Seattle, WA	1946	1999–present	—	—	Clinton
86	Circuit Judge	Johnnie B. Rawlinson	Las Vegas, NV	1952	2000–present	—	—	Clinton
89	Circuit Judge	Consuelo Callahan	Sacramento, CA	1950	2003–present	—	—	G.W. Bush
91	Circuit Judge	Milan Smith	El Segundo, CA	1942	2006–present	—	—	G.W. Bush
95	Circuit Judge	Morgan Christen	Anchorage, AK	1961	2012–present	—	—	Obama
96	Circuit Judge	Jacqueline Nguyen	Pasadena, CA	1965	2012–present	—	—	Obama
99	Circuit Judge	John B. Owens	San Diego, CA	1971	2014–present	—	—	Obama
100	Circuit Judge	Michelle Friedland	San Jose, CA	1972	2014–present	—	—	Obama
101	Circuit Judge	Mark J. Bennett	Honolulu, HI	1953	2018–present	—	—	Trump
102	Circuit Judge	Ryan D. Nelson	Idaho Falls, ID	1973	2018–present	—	—	Trump
103	Circuit Judge	Eric D. Miller	Seattle, WA	1975	2019–present	—	—	Trump
104	Circuit Judge	Bridget S. Bade	Phoenix, AZ	1965	2019–present	—	—	Trump
105	Circuit Judge	Daniel P. Collins	Pasadena, CA	1963	2019–present	—	—	Trump
106	Circuit Judge	Kenneth K. Lee	San Diego, CA	1975	2019–present	—	—	Trump
107	Circuit Judge	Daniel Bress	San Francisco, CA	1979	2019–present	—	—	Trump
108	Circuit Judge	Danielle J. Forrest	Portland, OR	1977	2019–present	—	—	Trump
109	Circuit Judge	Patrick J. Bumatay	San Diego, CA	1978	2019–present	—	—	Trump
110	Circuit Judge	Lawrence VanDyke	Reno, NV	1972	2020–present	—	—	Trump
111	Circuit Judge	Lucy Koh	San Francisco, CA	1968	2021–present	—	—	Biden
112	Circuit Judge	Jennifer Sung	Portland, OR	1972	2021–present	—	—	Biden
113	Circuit Judge	Gabriel P. Sanchez	San Francisco, CA	1976	2022–present	—	—	Biden
114	Circuit Judge	Holly A. Thomas	Pasadena, CA	1979	2022–present	—	—	Biden
115	Circuit Judge	Salvador Mendoza Jr.	Richland, WA	1971	2022–present	—	—	Biden
116	Circuit Judge	Roopali Desai	Phoenix, AZ	1978	2022–present	—	—	Biden
117	Circuit Judge	Anthony Johnstone	Missoula, MT	1973	2023–present	—	—	Biden
118	Circuit Judge	Ana de Alba	Fresno, CA	1979	2023–present	—	—	Biden
119	Circuit Judge	Eric Tung	Pasadena, CA	1984	2025–present	—	—	Trump
40	Senior Judge	J. Clifford Wallace	San Diego, CA	1928	1972–1996	1991–1996	1996–present	Nixon
47	Senior Judge	Mary M. Schroeder	Phoenix, AZ	1940	1979–2011	2000–2007	2011–present	Carter
54	Senior Judge	Dorothy Wright Nelson	Pasadena, CA	1928	1979–1995	—	1995–present	Carter
55	Senior Judge	William Canby	Phoenix, AZ	1931	1980–1996	—	1996–present	Carter
66	Senior Judge	Diarmuid O'Scannlain	Portland, OR	1937	1986–2016	—	2016–present	Reagan
68	Senior Judge	Stephen S. Trott	inactive	1939	1988–2004	—	2004–present	Reagan
69	Senior Judge	Ferdinand Fernandez	Pasadena, CA	1937	1989–2002	—	2002–present	G.H.W. Bush
73	Senior Judge	Michael Daly Hawkins	Phoenix, AZ	1945	1994–2010	—	2010–present	Clinton
74	Senior Judge	A. Wallace Tashima	Pasadena, CA	1934	1996–2004	—	2004–present	Clinton
75	Senior Judge	Sidney R. Thomas	Billings, MT	1953	1996–2023	2014–2021	2023–present	Clinton
76	Senior Judge	Barry G. Silverman	Phoenix, AZ	1951	1998–2016	—	2016–present	Clinton
77	Senior Judge	Susan P. Graber	Portland, OR	1949	1998–2021	—	2021–present	Clinton
78	Senior Judge	M. Margaret McKeown	San Diego, CA	1951	1998–2022	—	2022–present	Clinton
80	Senior Judge	William A. Fletcher	San Francisco, CA	1945	1998–2022	—	2022–present	Clinton
83	Senior Judge	Richard Paez	Pasadena, CA	1947	2000–2021	—	2021–present	Clinton
84	Senior Judge	Marsha Berzon	San Francisco, CA	1945	2000–2022	—	2022–present	Clinton
85	Senior Judge	Richard C. Tallman	Coeur d'Alene, ID	1953	2000–2018	—	2018–present	Clinton
87	Senior Judge	Richard Clifton	Honolulu, HI	1950	2002–2016	—	2016–present	G.W. Bush
88	Senior Judge	Jay Bybee	Las Vegas, NV	1953	2003–2019	—	2019–present	G.W. Bush
90	Senior Judge	Carlos Bea	San Francisco, CA	1934	2003–2019	—	2019–present	G.W. Bush
93	Senior Judge	N. Randy Smith	Pocatello, ID	1949	2007–2018	—	2018–present	G.W. Bush
98	Senior Judge	Andrew D. Hurwitz	Phoenix, AZ	1947	2012–2022	—	2022–present	Obama

== List of former judges ==
#	Judge	State	Born–died	Active service	Chief Judge	Senior status	Appointed by	Reason for termination
1	Lorenzo Sawyer	CA	1820–1891	1891	—	—	Grant / Operation of law (Note: Sawyer was appointed as a circuit judge for the Ninth Circuit in 1869 by Ulysses S. Grant. The Judiciary Act of 1891 reassigned his seat to what is now the U.S. Court of Appeals for the Ninth Circuit.)	death
2	Joseph McKenna	CA	1843–1926	1892–1897	—	—	B. Harrison	resignation
3	William Ball Gilbert	OR	1847–1931	1892–1931	—	—	B. Harrison	death
4	Erskine Mayo Ross	CA	1845–1928	1895–1925	—	1925–1928	Cleveland	death
5	William W. Morrow	CA	1843–1929	1897–1923	—	1923–1929	McKinley	resignation
6	William Henry Hunt	MT	1857–1949	1911–1928	—	1928	(Note: Hunt did not have a permanent seat on this court. Instead, he was appointed to the ill-fated United States Commerce Court in 1911 by William Howard Taft. Aside from their duties on the Commerce Court, the judges of the Commerce Court also acted as at-large appellate judges, able to be assigned by the Chief Justice of the United States to whichever circuit most needed help. Hunt was assigned to the Ninth Circuit upon his commission.)	resignation
7	Frank H. Rudkin	WA	1864–1931	1923–1931	—	—	Harding	death
8	Wallace McCamant	OR	1867–1944	1925 (Note: Recess appointment not confirmed)–1926	—	—	Coolidge	not confirmed
9	Frank Sigel Dietrich	ID	1863–1930	1927–1930	—	—	Coolidge	death
10	Curtis D. Wilbur	CA	1867–1954	1929–1945	—	1945–1954	Hoover (Note: President Coolidge first nominated Wilbur for the judgeship in the final days of his presidency, but the Senate failed to act on it before the 70tb Congress ended on March 3, 1929. Hoover then resubmitted the nomination to the Senate in the 71st Congress, which approved it.)	death
11	William Henry Sawtelle	AZ	1868–1934	1931–1934	—	—	Hoover	death
12	Francis Arthur Garrecht	WA	1870–1948	1933–1948	—	—	F. Roosevelt	death
13	William Denman	CA	1872–1959	1935–1957	1948–1957	1957–1959	F. Roosevelt	death
14	Clifton Mathews	AZ	1880–1962	1935–1953	—	1953–1962	F. Roosevelt	death
15	Bert E. Haney	OR	1879–1943	1935–1943	—	—	F. Roosevelt	death
16	Albert Lee Stephens Sr.	CA	1874–1965	1937–1961	1957–1959	1961–1965	F. Roosevelt	death
17	William Healy	ID	1881–1962	1937–1958	—	1958–1962	F. Roosevelt	death
18	Homer Bone	WA	1883–1970	1944–1956	—	1956–1970	F. Roosevelt	death
19	William Edwin Orr	NV	1881–1965	1945–1956	—	1956–1965	Truman	death
20	Walter Lyndon Pope	MT	1889–1969	1949–1961	1959	1961–1969	Truman	death
21	Dal Millington Lemmon	CA	1887–1958	1954–1958	—	—	Eisenhower	death
22	Richard Chambers	AZ	1906–1994	1954–1976	1959–1976	1976–1994	Eisenhower	death
23	James Alger Fee	OR	1888–1959	1954–1959	—	—	Eisenhower	death
24	Stanley Barnes	CA	1900–1990	1956–1970	—	1970–1990	Eisenhower	death
25	Frederick Hamley	WA	1903–1975	1956–1971	—	1971–1975	Eisenhower	death
26	Oliver Deveta Hamlin Jr.	CA	1892–1973	1958–1963	—	1963–1973	Eisenhower	death
27	Gilbert H. Jertberg	CA	1897–1973	1958–1967	—	1967–1973	Eisenhower	death
28	Charles Merton Merrill	NV	1907–1996	1959–1974	—	1974–1996	Eisenhower	death
29	Montgomery Koelsch	ID	1912–1992	1959–1976	—	1976–1992	Eisenhower	death
30	James R. Browning	CA	1918–2012	1961–2000	1976–1988	2000–2012	Kennedy	death
31	Benjamin C. Duniway	CA	1907–1986	1961–1976	—	1976–1986	Kennedy	death
32	Walter Raleigh Ely Jr.	CA	1913–1984	1964–1979	—	1979–1984	L. Johnson	death
33	James Marshall Carter	CA	1904–1979	1967–1971	—	1971–1979	L. Johnson	death
34	Shirley Hufstedler	CA	1925–2016	1968–1979	—	—	L. Johnson	resignation
35	Eugene Allen Wright	WA	1913–2002	1969–1983	—	1983–2002	Nixon	death
36	John Kilkenny	OR	1901–1995	1969–1971	—	1971–1995	Nixon	death
37	Ozell Miller Trask	AZ	1909–1984	1969–1979	—	1979–1984	Nixon	death
38	Herbert Choy	HI	1916–2004	1971–1984	—	1984–2004	Nixon	death
39	Alfred Goodwin	CA	1923–2022	1971–1991	1988–1991	1991–2022	Nixon	death
41	Joseph Tyree Sneed III	CA	1920–2008	1973–1987	—	1987–2008	Nixon	death
42	Anthony Kennedy	CA	1936–present	1975–1988	—	—	Ford	elevation
43	J. Blaine Anderson	ID	1922–1988	1976–1988	—	—	Ford	death
44	Procter Ralph Hug Jr.	NV	1931–2019	1977–2002	1996–2000	2002–2017	Carter	retirement
45	Thomas Tang	AZ	1922–1995	1977–1993	—	1993–1995	Carter	death
46	Betty Binns Fletcher	WA	1923–2012	1979–1998	—	1998–2012	Carter	death
48	Otto Richard Skopil Jr.	OR	1919–2012	1979–1986	—	1986–2012	Carter	death
49	Jerome Farris	WA	1930–2020	1979–1995	—	1995–2020	Carter	death
50	Arthur Alarcón	CA	1925–2015	1979–1992	—	1992–2015	Carter	death
51	Harry Pregerson	CA	1923–2017	1979–2015	—	2015–2017	Carter	death
52	Warren J. Ferguson	CA	1920–2008	1979–1986	—	1986–2008	Carter	death
53	Cecil F. Poole	CA	1914–1997	1979–1996	—	1996–1997	Carter	death
56	Robert Boochever	AK	1917–2011	1980–1986	—	1986–2011	Carter	death
57	William Albert Norris	CA	1927–2017	1980–1994	—	1994–1997	Carter	retirement
58	Stephen Reinhardt	CA	1931–2018	1980–2018	—	—	Carter	death
59	Robert Beezer	WA	1928–2012	1984–1996	—	1996–2012	Reagan	death
60	Cynthia Holcomb Hall	CA	1929–2011	1984–1997	—	1997–2011	Reagan	death
61	Charles E. Wiggins	CA	1927–2000	1984–1996	—	1996–2000	Reagan	death
62	Melvin T. Brunetti	NV	1933–2009	1985–1999	—	1999–2009	Reagan	death
63	Alex Kozinski	CA	1950–present	1985–2017	2007–2014	—	Reagan	retirement
64	John T. Noonan Jr.	CA	1926–2017	1985–1996	—	1996–2017	Reagan	death
65	David R. Thompson	CA	1930–2011	1985–1998	—	1998–2011	Reagan	death
67	Edward Leavy	OR	1929–2023	1987–1997	—	1997–2023	Reagan	death
70	Pamela Ann Rymer	CA	1941–2011	1989–2011	—	—	G.H.W. Bush	death
71	Thomas G. Nelson	ID	1936–2011	1990–2003	—	2003–2011	G.H.W. Bush	death
72	Andrew Kleinfeld	AK	1945–2025	1991–2010	—	2010–2025	G.H.W. Bush	death
81	Raymond C. Fisher	CA	1939–2020	1999–2013	—	2013–2020	Clinton	death
92	Sandra Segal Ikuta	CA	1954–2025	2006–2025	—	2025	G.W. Bush	death
97	Paul J. Watford	CA	1967–present	2012–2023	—	—	Obama	resignation

== Chief judges ==
Chief Judge
Denman	1948–1957
Stephens, Sr.	1957–1959
Pope	1959
Chambers	1959–1976
Browning	1976–1988
Goodwin	1988–1991
Wallace	1991–1996
Hug, Jr.	1996–2000
Schroeder	2000–2007
Kozinski	2007–2014
S.R. Thomas	2014–2021
Murguia	2021–present

Chief judges have administrative responsibilities with respect to their circuits, and preside over any panel on which they serve, unless the circuit justice (the Supreme Court justice responsible for the circuit) is also on the panel. Unlike the Supreme Court, where one justice is specifically nominated to be chief, the office of chief judge rotates among the circuit judges.

To be chief, a judge must have been in active service on the court for at least one year, be under the age of 65, and have not previously served as chief judge. A vacancy is filled by the judge highest in seniority among the group of qualified judges, with seniority determined first by commission date, then by age. The chief judge serves for a term of seven years, or until age 70, whichever occurs first. If no judge qualifies to be chief, the youngest judge over the age of 65 who has served on the court for at least one year shall act as chief until another judge qualifies. If no judge has served on the court for more than a year, the most senior judge shall act as chief. Judges can forfeit or resign their chief judgeship or acting chief judgeship while retaining their active status as a circuit judge.

When the office was created in 1948, the chief judge was the longest-serving judge who had not elected to retire, on what has since 1958 been known as senior status, or declined to serve as chief judge. After August 6, 1959, judges could not become or remain chief after turning 70 years old. The current rules have been in operation since October 1, 1982.

== Succession of seats ==
The court has 29 seats for active judges, numbered in the order in which they were initially filled. Judges who assume senior status enter a kind of retirement in which they remain on the bench but vacate their seats, thus allowing the U.S. President to appoint new judges to fill their seats.

Seat 1
Established on December 10, 1869 by the Judiciary Act of 1869 as a circuit judgeship for the Ninth Circuit
Reassigned to the United States Circuit Court of Appeals for the Ninth Circuit by the Judiciary Act of 1891
Sawyer	CA	1891
McKenna	CA	1892–1897
Morrow	CA	1897–1923
Rudkin	WA	1923–1931
Garrecht	WA	1933–1948
Pope	MT	1949–1961
Browning	MT	1961–2000
Ikuta	CA	2006–2025
Tung	CA	2025–present

Seat 2
Established on June 16, 1891 by the Judiciary Act of 1891
Gilbert	OR	1892–1931
Denman	CA	1935–1957
Hamlin Jr.	CA	1958–1963
Ely Jr.	CA	1964–1979
Norris	CA	1980–1994
W. Fletcher	CA	1998–2022
H.A. Thomas	CA	2022–present

Seat 3
Established on February 18, 1895 by 28 Stat. 665
Ross	CA	1895–1925
McCamant	OR	1925–1926
Dietrich	ID	1927–1930
Sawtelle	AZ	1931–1934
Mathews	AZ	1935–1953
Fee	OR	1954–1959
Koelsch	ID	1959–1976
Anderson	ID	1976–1988
T. Nelson	ID	1990–2003
N.R. Smith	ID	2007–2018
R. Nelson	ID	2018–present

Seat 4
Established as a temporary judgeship on March 1, 1929 by 45 Stat. 1414
Made permanent on June 16, 1933 by 48 Stat. 310
Wilbur	CA	1929–1945
Orr	NV	1945–1956
Barnes	CA	1956–1970
Choy	HI	1971–1984
Brunetti	NV	1985–1999
Rawlinson	NV	2000–present

Seat 5
Established on August 2, 1935 by 49 Stat. 508
Haney	OR	1935–1943
Bone	WA	1944–1956
Hamley	WA	1956–1971
Sneed III	CA	1973–1987
Trott	CA/ID	1988–2004
Owens	CA	2014–present

Seat 6
Established on April 14, 1937 by 50 Stat. 64
Stephens Sr.	CA	1937–1961
Duniway	CA	1961–1976
Hug Jr.	NV	1977–2002
Bybee	NV	2003–2019
VanDyke	NV	2020–present

Seat 7
Established on April 14, 1937 by 50 Stat. 64
Healy	ID	1937–1958
Merrill	NV	1959–1974
Kennedy	CA	1975–1988
Rymer	CA	1989–2011
Watford	CA	2012–2023
de Alba	CA	2023–present

Seat 8
Established on February 10, 1954 by 68 Stat. 871
Lemmon	CA	1954–1958
Jertberg	CA	1958–1967
Carter	CA	1967–1971
Wallace	CA	1972–1996
Wardlaw	CA	1998–present

Seat 9
Established on February 10, 1954 by 68 Stat. 871
Chambers	AZ	1954–1976
Tang	AZ	1977–1993
Hawkins	AZ	1994–2010
Murguia	AZ	2011–present

Seat 10
Established on June 18, 1968 by 82 Stat. 184
Hufstedler	CA	1968–1979
Boochever	AK	1980–1986
O'Scannlain	OR	1986–2016
Forrest	OR	2019–present

Seat 11
Established on June 18, 1968 by 82 Stat. 184
Wright	WA	1969–1983
Beezer	WA	1984–1996
Gould	WA	1999–present

Seat 12
Established on June 18, 1968 by 82 Stat. 184
Kilkenny	OR	1969–1971
Goodwin	OR	1971–1991
Kleinfeld	AK	1991–2010
Christen	AK	2011–present

Seat 13
Established on June 18, 1968 by 82 Stat. 184
Trask	AZ	1969–1979
Canby	AZ	1980–1996
Silverman	AZ	1998–2016
Bade	AZ	2019–present

Seat 14
Established on October 20, 1978 by 92 Stat. 1629
Schroeder	AZ	1979–2011
Hurwitz	AZ	2012–2022
Desai	AZ	2022–present

Seat 15
Established on October 20, 1978 by 92 Stat. 1629
Skopil Jr.	OR	1979–1986
Leavy	OR	1987–1997
Graber	OR	1998–2021
Sung	OR	2021–present

Seat 16
Established on October 20, 1978 by 92 Stat. 1629
B. Fletcher	WA	1979–1998
Tallman	WA	2000–2018
Miller	WA	2019–present

Seat 17
Established on October 20, 1978 by 92 Stat. 1629
Farris	WA	1979–1995
McKeown	WA/CA	1998–2022
Mendoza Jr.	WA	2022–present

Seat 18
Established on October 20, 1978 by 92 Stat. 1629
Alarcón	CA	1979–1992
Tashima	CA	1996–2004
M.D. Smith	CA	2006–present

Seat 19
Established on October 20, 1978 by 92 Stat. 1629
Pregerson	CA	1979–2015
Collins	CA	2019–present

Seat 20
Established on October 20, 1978 by 92 Stat. 1629
Ferguson	CA	1979–1986
Fernandez	CA	1989–2002
Callahan	CA	2003–present

Seat 21
Established on October 20, 1978 by 92 Stat. 1629
Poole	CA	1979–1996
Paez	CA	2000–2021
Koh	CA	2021–present

Seat 22
Established on October 20, 1978 by 92 Stat. 1629
D. Nelson	CA	1979–1995
S.R. Thomas	MT	1996–2023
Johnstone	MT	2023–present

Seat 23
Established on October 20, 1978 by 92 Stat. 1629
Reinhardt	CA	1980–2018
Lee	CA	2019–present

Seat 24
Established on July 10, 1984 by 98 Stat. 333
Wiggins	CA	1984–1996
Bea	CA	2003–2019
Bumatay	CA	2019–present

Seat 25
Established on July 10, 1984 by 98 Stat. 333
Hall	CA	1984–1997
Clifton	HI	2002–2016
Bennett	HI	2018–present

Seat 26
Established on July 10, 1984 by 98 Stat. 333
Kozinski	CA	1985–2017
Bress	CA	2019–present

Seat 27
Established on July 10, 1984 by 98 Stat. 333
Thompson	CA	1985–1998
Fisher	CA	1999–2013
Friedland	CA	2014–present

Seat 28
Established on July 10, 1984 by 98 Stat. 333
Noonan, Jr.	CA	1985–1996
Berzon	CA	2000–2022
Sanchez	CA	2022–present

Seat 29
Established on January 21, 2009 by 121 Stat. 2543
Nguyen	CA	2012–present

== See also ==
- Courts of California
- Ninth Circuit appointment history
- List of current United States circuit judges
