= Ben C. Duniway =

American judge (1907–1986)

Senior Judge of the United States Court of Appeals for the Ninth Circuit
- In office October 5, 1976 – August 23, 1986

Judge of the United States Court of Appeals for the Ninth Circuit
- In office September 22, 1961 – October 5, 1976
- Appointed by: John F. Kennedy
- Preceded by: Albert Lee Stephens Sr.
- Succeeded by: Procter Ralph Hug Jr.

Personal details
- Born: Benjamin Cushing Duniway; November 21, 1907 Stanford, California, U.S.
- Died: August 23, 1986 (aged 78) Stanford, California, U.S.
- Spouse: Ruth Mason Duniway (1907 - 1985)
- Education: Carleton College (BA); Stanford Law School (LLB); Oxford University (BA, MA)

Benjamin Cushing Duniway (November 21, 1907 – August 23, 1986) was a United States circuit judge of the United States Court of Appeals for the Ninth Circuit.

== Education and career ==
Born on November 21, 1907, in Stanford, California, Duniway received a Bachelor of Arts degree in 1928 from Carleton College, a Bachelor of Laws in 1931 from Stanford Law School and a Bachelor of Arts in 1933 from the University of Oxford. He received a Master of Arts in 1964 from the University of Oxford. He entered private practice in San Francisco, California from 1933 to 1942 and from 1947 to 1959. He was a regional attorney for the Office of Price Administration in San Francisco and Washington, D.C. from 1945 to 1947. He was a Justice of the First District of the California Court of Appeal from 1959 to 1961.

== Federal judicial service ==
Duniway was nominated by President John F. Kennedy on September 14, 1961, to a seat on the United States Court of Appeals for the Ninth Circuit vacated by Judge Albert Lee Stephens Sr. He was confirmed by the United States Senate on September 21, 1961, and received his commission on September 22, 1961. He assumed senior status on October 5, 1976. He served as a Judge of the Temporary Emergency Court of Appeals from 1979 to 1986. His service terminated on August 23, 1986, due to his death in Stanford.

== Death ==
Duniway died on August 23, 1986, at the age of 78 after suffering from a short illness. He and his wife, Ruth (who died the previous year) were buried at Cypress Lawn Memorial Park in Colma, California.

== Sources ==
- "Obituary". New York Times. 1986-08-29.

Legal offices
Preceded by Albert Lee Stephens Sr.	Judge of the United States Court of Appeals for the Ninth Circuit; 1961–1976	Succeeded by Procter Ralph Hug Jr.
