= Eric Tung =

American federal judge (born 1984)

Judge of the United States Court of Appeals for the Ninth Circuit
- Incumbent
- Assumed office November 7, 2025
- Appointed by: Donald Trump
- Preceded by: Sandra Segal Ikuta

Personal details
- Born: Eric Chunyee Tung; 1984 (age 41–42) Los Angeles, California, U.S.
- Education: Yale University (BA); University of Chicago (JD)

Eric Chunyee Tung (born 1984) is an American lawyer and jurist who serves as a U.S. circuit judge of the United States Court of Appeals for the Ninth Circuit. He was appointed in 2025 by President Donald Trump. Before becoming a federal judge, Tung was a partner at the law firm Jones Day.

== Early life and education ==
Tung was born in 1984 in Woodland Hills, Los Angeles, California. He graduated from Yale University in 2006 with a Bachelor of Arts in philosophy. After spending a year studying Mandarin Chinese at Peking University, Tung attended the University of Chicago Law School, where he was a managing editor of the University of Chicago Law Review. He graduated in 2010 with a Juris Doctor with high honors and Order of the Coif membership.

After law school, Tung was a law clerk to then-Judge Neil Gorsuch of the United States Court of Appeals for the Tenth Circuit from 2010 to 2011 and to Associate Justice Antonin Scalia of the United States Supreme Court from 2012 to 2013. Tung clerked for Gorsuch again from 2017 to 2018, after Gorsuch was confirmed to the United States Supreme Court.

== Career ==
Tung served with the United States Department of Justice as a Bristow Fellow in the office of the Solicitor General of the United States from 2011 to 2012, as an assistant United States attorney in the Central District of California in Los Angeles from 2016 to 2017 and as counsel in the Office of Legal Policy in 2017. In 2019, Tung joined Jones Day at their Los Angeles office, where his focus was on appeals, commercial law, qui tam actions, health care law, product liability, and cryptocurrency law.

=== Federal judicial service ===
On July 2, 2025, President Donald Trump announced his intention to nominate Tung to a seat to be vacated by Judge Sandra Segal Ikuta of the United States Court of Appeals for the Ninth Circuit. After a hearing on his nomination on July 30, 2025, the Senate Judiciary Committee advanced it to the United States Senate on September 11, 2025 by a 12–10 vote. The Senate invoked cloture on Tung's nomination by a 51–46 vote and confirmed him on November 5, 2025 by a 52–45 vote. He received his judicial commission on November 7, 2025.

== Personal life ==
Tung is a convert to Roman Catholicism whose conversion was influenced by the Opus Dei movement.

== See also ==
- List of law clerks for the ninth seat of the Supreme Court of the United States

Legal offices
Preceded by Sandra Segal Ikuta	Judge of the United States Court of Appeals for the Ninth Circuit; 2025–present	Incumbent
