= Edward Whitson =

American judge

Edward N. Whitson
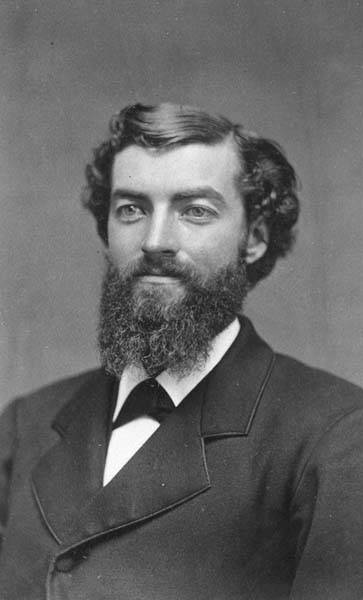

Judge of the United States District Court for the Eastern District of Washington
- In office March 14, 1905 – October 15, 1910
- Appointed by: Theodore Roosevelt
- Preceded by: Seat established by 33 Stat. 824
- Succeeded by: Frank H. Rudkin

Personal details
- Born: Edward N. Whitson; October 6, 1852 Linn County, Oregon Territory
- Died: October 15, 1910 (aged 58) Spokane, Washington, U.S.
- Education: read law

Edward N. Whitson (October 6, 1852 – October 15, 1910) was a United States district judge of the United States District Court for the Eastern District of Washington.

== Education and career ==
Born in Linn County, Oregon Territory, (now Oregon) (some sources say Salem, in Marion County, Oregon Territory), Whitson was an auditor in Yakima County, Washington Territory (State of Washington from November 11, 1889) from 1875 to 1876, and a member of the Washington Territorial Legislature from 1877 to 1878. He read law to enter the bar in 1879, and was Mayor of North Yakima (now Yakima), Washington Territory from 1886 to 1888, also maintaining a private practice.

== Federal judicial service ==

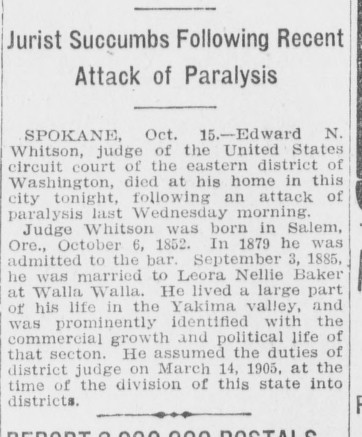

On March 10, 1905, Whitson was nominated by President Theodore Roosevelt to a new seat on the United States District Court for the Eastern District of Washington created by 33 Stat. 824. He was confirmed by the United States Senate on March 14, 1905, and received his commission the same day. Whitson served in that capacity until his death on October 15, 1910, after suffering attacks of paralysis.

== Sources ==
Legal offices
Preceded by Seat established by 33 Stat. 824	Judge of the United States District Court for the Eastern District of Washington; 1905–1910	Succeeded by Frank H. Rudkin
