= William Ball Gilbert =

American judge (1847–1931)

- Gilbert in 1928

Judge of the United States Court of Appeals for the Ninth Circuit
- In office March 18, 1892 – April 27, 1931
- Appointed by: Benjamin Harrison
- Preceded by: Seat established by 26 Stat. 826
- Succeeded by: William Denman

Judge of the United States Circuit Courts for the Ninth Circuit
- In office March 18, 1892 – December 31, 1911
- Appointed by: Benjamin Harrison
- Preceded by: Seat established by 26 Stat. 826
- Succeeded by: Seat abolished

Personal details
- Born: William Ball Gilbert; July 4, 1847 Lewinsville, Virginia
- Died: April 27, 1931 (aged 83) Portland, Oregon
- Party: Republican
- Education: Williams College (AB); University of Michigan Law School (LLB)

William Ball Gilbert (July 4, 1847 – April 27, 1931) was an American attorney and jurist from Oregon. He served as a United States circuit judge of the United States Court of Appeals for the Ninth Circuit and of the United States Circuit Courts for the Ninth Circuit. A native of Virginia, he previously served in the Oregon Legislative Assembly.

== Early life ==
Gilbert was born in Lewinsville, Virginia on July 4, 1847 to Sarah Catherine Ball and John Gilbert. William was named after Colonel William Ball] the grandfather of George Washington's mother Mary Ball; he was related to the colonel from his mother's side of the family. He went to local private schools in Lewinsville, located in Fairfax County, and to schools in neighboring Falls Church.

The Gilbert family had pro-Union sympathies, and moved to Ohio before the American Civil War. Gilbert attended high school in Zanesville, Ohio before moving to Williamstown, Massachusetts to attend Williams College. He graduated from Williams in 1868 with an Artium Baccalaureus degree. After graduation he went to the Amazon Basin on a scientific expedition followed by a geologic expedition to Ohio for two years. After giving up on a scientific career, he earned a Bachelor of Laws in 1872 from the University of Michigan Law School. Gilbert was admitted to the bar in Michigan that year, and then moved to Oregon.

== Oregon ==
In 1873, Gilbert was admitted to the Oregon bar and began practicing law in Portland with H. H. Northrup at what is now Miller Nash Graham & Dunn LLP. On September 3, 1873, Gilbert married Julia West Lindsley. In 1876, he went into a legal partnership with future Governor of Oregon A. C. Gibbs, but only for one year before entering into a partnership with Northrup. Gilbert remained in private legal practice in Portland until 1892, working with John M. Gearin and Zera Snow. In 1888, he was elected to the Oregon House of Representatives. A Republican, he represented Portland, serving only during the 1889 legislative session.

== Federal judicial service ==
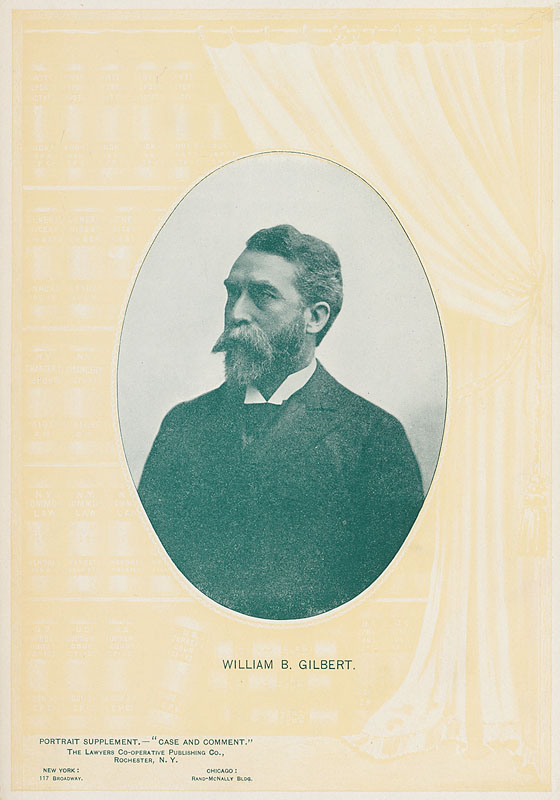
Gilbert earlier in his career

Gilbert was nominated by President Benjamin Harrison on February 23, 1892, to the United States Court of Appeals for the Ninth Circuit and the United States Circuit Courts for the Ninth Circuit, to a new joint seat authorized by 26 Stat. 826. He was confirmed by the United States Senate on March 18, 1892, and received his commission the same day. On December 31, 1911, the Circuit Courts were abolished and he thereafter served only on the Court of Appeals. He was a member of the Conference of Senior Circuit Judges (now the Judicial Conference of the United States) from 1922 to 1930. His service terminated on April 27, 1931, due to his death at his home in Portland. He was the last federal judge in active service to have been appointed by President Harrison. After Gilbert's death, William Denman replaced him on the court.

=== Brief nomination controversy ===
Gilbert's nomination to the court was hampered when one of the associates in his firm, future judge Wallace McCamant, wrote a letter to a friend expounding that McCamant would gain financially from Gilbert's election to the court. After it was explained that the financial gain had to do with McCamant becoming partner in the firm if Gilbert left, and not something illicit, the nomination moved forward.

=== Courthouse and notable cases ===
Gilbert was assigned to the federal courthouse in Portland, now named the Pioneer Courthouse. While on the court he was responsible for many important decisions, while also serving as the senior ranking judge on the court for 34 years. These including cases concerning the scandal over gold mining in Alaska, a controversy over Leland Stanford's estate and Stanford University, a lawsuit over the Teapot Dome scandal, and the Ninth's opinion in what became the Olmstead v. United States wiretapping case.

=== Relationship with Joseph McKenna ===
Gilbert also worked alongside Joseph McKenna, who would later become United States Attorney General before William McKinley nominated McKenna to the United States Supreme Court. Based on his poor view of McKenna's legal abilities, Gilbert openly opposed McKenna's nomination to the country's high court.

== Later years ==
From 1893 to 1918, Gilbert lectured on constitutional law at the University of Oregon School of Law. In 1898, he received an honorary doctorate of laws from his alma mater Williams College. In Portland, Gilbert was a member of the Arlington Club, while in San Francisco, California (home of the Ninth Circuit Court) he was a member of the Southern Club. Described as charming and industrious, he was a very private individual who also refused to ride in automobiles, which he disdained.

== See also ==
- List of United States federal judges by longevity of service

Legal offices
Preceded by Seat established by 26 Stat. 826	Judge of the United States Circuit Courts for the Ninth Circuit; 1892–1911	Succeeded by Seat abolished
Preceded by Seat established by 26 Stat. 826	Judge of the United States Court of Appeals for the Ninth Circuit; 1892–1931	Succeeded by William Denman
