= William Denman (judge) =

American judge (1872–1959)

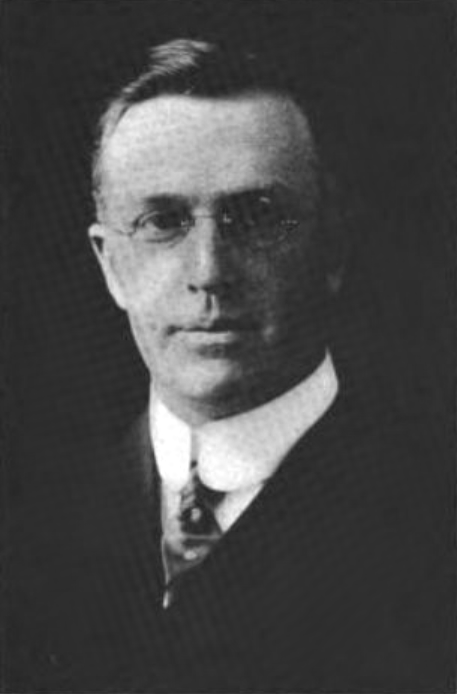

Senior Judge of the United States Court of Appeals for the Ninth Circuit
- In office July 3, 1957 – March 9, 1959

Chief Judge of the United States Court of Appeals for the Ninth Circuit
- In office September 1, 1948 – July 3, 1957
- Preceded by: Office established
- Succeeded by: Albert Lee Stephens Sr.

Judge of the United States Court of Appeals for the Ninth Circuit
- In office February 1, 1935 – July 3, 1957
- Appointed by: Franklin D. Roosevelt
- Preceded by: William Ball Gilbert
- Succeeded by: Oliver Deveta Hamlin Jr.

Personal details
- Born: William Denman; November 7, 1872 San Francisco, California, U.S.
- Died: March 9, 1959 (aged 86)
- Education: University of California, Berkeley (B. Litt.); Harvard Law School (LLB)

William Denman (November 7, 1872 – March 9, 1959) was a United States circuit judge of the United States Court of Appeals for the Ninth Circuit.

== Education and career ==
Born in San Francisco, California, Denman attended Lowell High School, received a Bachelor of Letters degree from the University of California, Berkeley in 1894, and a Bachelor of Laws from Harvard Law School in 1897. He entered private practice in San Francisco in 1898, and was an assistant professor and lecturer at the University of California, Hastings College of the Law from 1902 to 1906.

== Federal judicial service ==
On January 10, 1935, Denman was nominated by President Franklin D. Roosevelt to a seat on the United States Court of Appeals for the Ninth Circuit vacated by Judge William Ball Gilbert. Denman was confirmed by the United States Senate on January 29, 1935, and received his commission on February 1, 1935. He served as Chief Judge and as a member of the Judicial Conference of the United States from September 1, 1948 to July 3, 1957, when he assumed senior status. He continued to serve in that capacity until his death on March 9, 1959.

== Notable case ==
Denman dissented in Korematsu v. United States (9th Cir. 1943). The Ninth Circuit permitted the government to force Japanese Americans into internment camps, and the Supreme Court affirmed the following year.

Denman wrote: "If it be unusual for a judge of a court in which he is a participant to dissent from his associates on the matter of a certification, the occasion is even more unusual.

Under the threat of penitentiary sentences to these 70,000 American citizens who have relied on the right they believe the Constitution gives them, we are driving from their homes to internment camps, not men alone, as with the deportation of the Dutch by the Germans, but their wives and children, without giving the latter the choice to remain in their homes. We are destroying their businesses, in effect, as if such citizens were enemy aliens. The destruction of their business connections means for many that they will not be able to return to their native areas; in effect, as were the French Canadians so taken to Louisiana."

== Sources ==
- Guide to the William Denman Papers at The Bancroft Library
- Jonathan van Harmelen. "William Denman: A Voice of Dissent on the Courts - Part 1." Discover Nikkei, June 8, 2022. https://www.discovernikkei.org/en/journal/2022/6/8/william-denman-1/
- Jonathan van Harmelen. "William Denman: A Voice of Dissent on the Courts - Part 2." Discover Nikkei, June 9, 2022. https://www.discovernikkei.org/en/journal/2022/6/9/william-denman-2/

Legal offices
Preceded by William Ball Gilbert	Judge of the United States Court of Appeals for the Ninth Circuit; 1935–1957	Succeeded by Oliver Deveta Hamlin Jr.
Preceded by Office established	Chief Judge of the United States Court of Appeals for the Ninth Circuit; 1948–1957	Succeeded by Albert Lee Stephens Sr.
