= James R. Browning =

American judge (1918–2012)

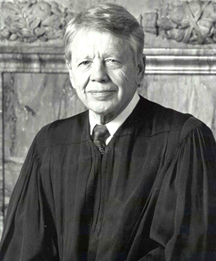

Senior Judge of the United States Court of Appeals for the Ninth Circuit
- In office September 1, 2000 – May 6, 2012

Chief Judge of the United States Court of Appeals for the Ninth Circuit
- In office July 1, 1976 – June 15, 1988
- Preceded by: Richard Harvey Chambers
- Succeeded by: Alfred Goodwin

Judge of the United States Court of Appeals for the Ninth Circuit
- In office September 18, 1961 – September 1, 2000
- Appointed by: John F. Kennedy
- Preceded by: Walter Lyndon Pope
- Succeeded by: Sandra Segal Ikuta

Personal details
- Born: James Robert Browning; October 1, 1918 Great Falls, Montana, U.S.
- Died: May 6, 2012 (aged 93) Marin County, California, U.S.
- Education: University of Montana (LLB)

Military service
- Branch/service: United States Army
- Battles/wars: World War II

James Robert Browning (October 1, 1918 – May 6, 2012) was an American attorney and jurist who served as a United States circuit judge of the United States Court of Appeals for the Ninth Circuit.

== Early life and education ==
Browning was born on October 1, 1918, in Great Falls, Montana. He grew up in Belt, Montana and attended high school there.

He was a founding member of the Montana Law Review.

Browning received a Bachelor of Laws in 1941 from the Alexander Blewett III School of Law at the University of Montana.

== Career ==
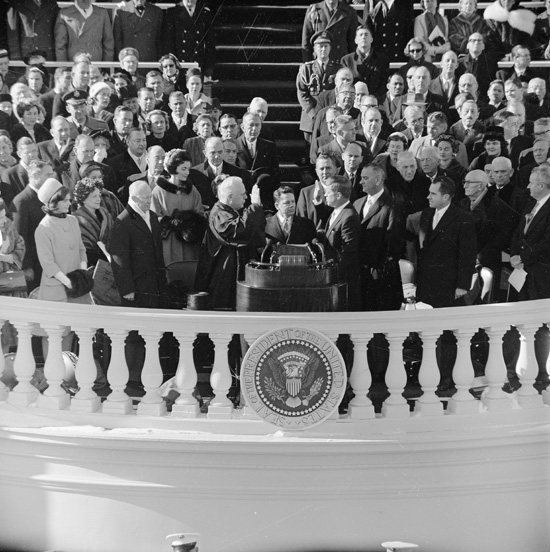
As Clerk of the Supreme Court, Browning (center) held the Bible during John F. Kennedy's Inauguration

He was a special attorney for the Antitrust Division of the United States Department of Justice in Denver, Colorado from 1941 to 1943. He was a United States Army lieutenant from 1943 to 1946. He was again a special attorney with the Antitrust Division in Washington, D.C. from 1946 to 1948. He was Chief of the Northwest Regional Office of the Antitrust Division in Seattle, Washington from 1948 to 1949. He was Assistant Chief of the General Litigation Section of the Antitrust Division in Washington, D.C. from 1949 to 1951. He was First Assistant of the Civil Division of the United States Department of Justice in Washington, D.C. from 1951 to 1952. He was Executive Assistant for the Office of the Attorney General of the United States from 1952 to 1953. He was the Chief of the Executive Office for United States Attorneys in 1953. He was in private practice in Washington, D.C. from 1953 to 1958. Browning was Clerk of the Supreme Court of the United States from 1958 to 1961, and held the Bible for the oath of office at John F. Kennedy's inauguration, at a time when the Supreme Court Clerk traditionally performed this task at all presidential inaugurations. Lyndon Johnson effectively ended this tradition in 1965 when he asked his wife, Lady Bird, to hold the Bible for his swearing-in, something which all First Ladies have done ever since.

=== Federal judicial service ===
Browning was nominated by President John F. Kennedy on September 6, 1961, to a seat on the United States Court of Appeals for the Ninth Circuit vacated by Judge Walter Lyndon Pope. He was confirmed by the United States Senate on September 14, 1961, and received his commission on September 18, 1961. He served as Chief Judge and a member of the Judicial Conference of the United States from July 1, 1976 to June 15, 1988. He assumed senior status on September 1, 2000. He was the last federal appeals court judge in active service to have been appointed by President Kennedy. His service terminated on May 6, 2012, due to his death in Marin County, California.

== Honors ==
In 1992, Browning was awarded the Edward J. Devitt Award for Distinguished Service to Justice, which is presented annually to a federal judge. In 2001, the Montana State Bar Association gave Browning its highest honor, the Jameson Award. In 2005, the main Ninth Circuit Court of Appeals courthouse in San Francisco was named in his honor.

== See also ==
- List of United States federal judges by longevity of service

Legal offices
Preceded by Walter Lyndon Pope	Judge of the United States Court of Appeals for the Ninth Circuit; 1961–2000	Succeeded by Sandra Segal Ikuta
Preceded by Richard Harvey Chambers	Chief Judge of the United States Court of Appeals for the Ninth Circuit; 1976–1988	Succeeded by Alfred Goodwin
