= James R. Browning United States Court of Appeals Building =

- U.S. Post Office and Courthouse
- U.S. National Register of Historic Places
- U.S. National Historic Landmark
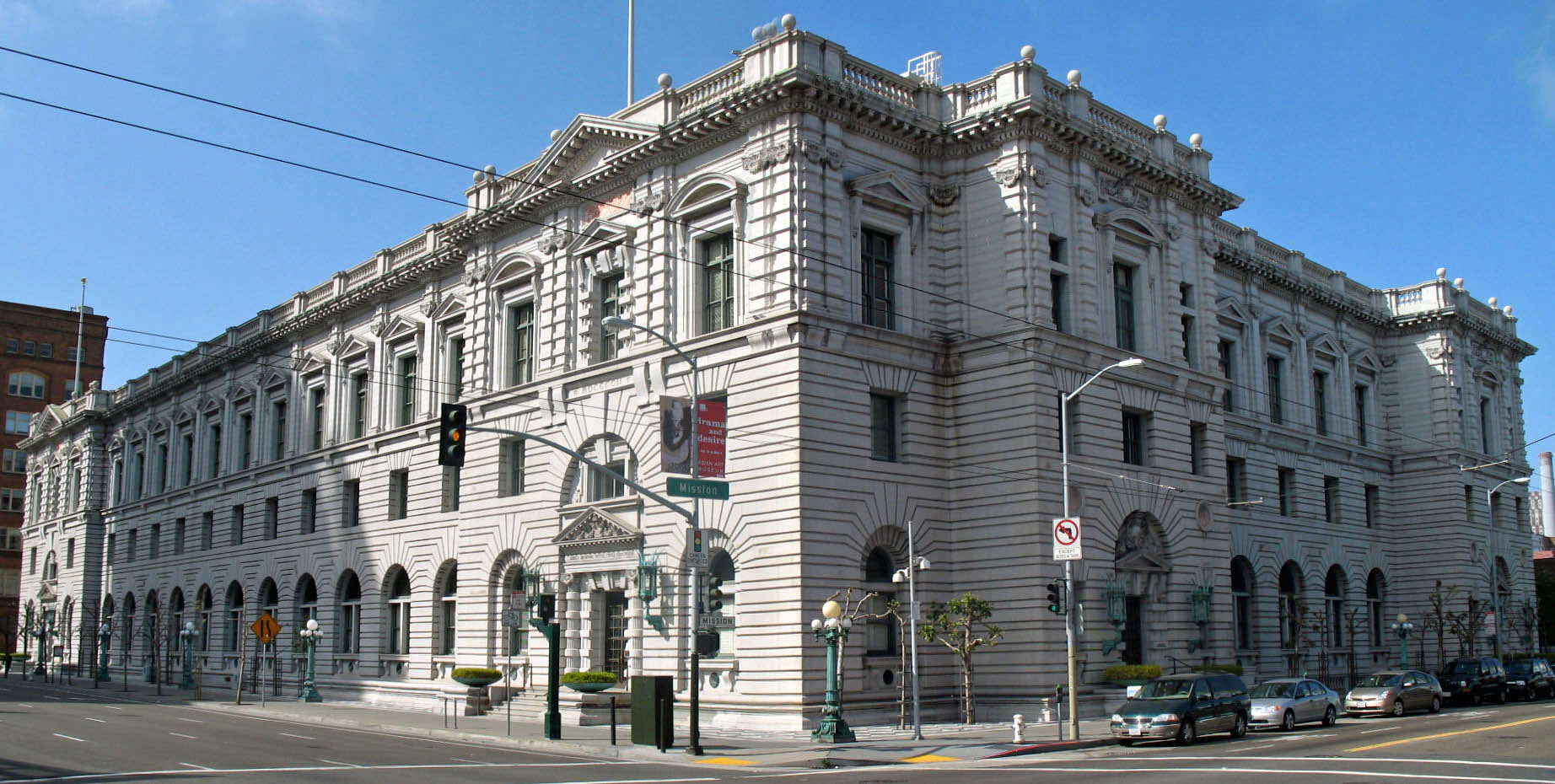
- James R. Browning U.S. Court of Appeals Building, May 2008

- Location within San Francisco County Location within California Location within the United States
- Location: NE corner of 7th and Mission Sts., San Francisco, California, US
- Coordinates: 37°46′48″N 122°24′40″W
- Area: 2.6 acres (1.1 ha)
- Built: 1905
- Architects: Taylor, James Knox
- Architectural style: Beaux Arts, Italian Renaissance Palazzo, Art Deco
- NRHP reference No.: 71000188

Significant dates
- Added to NRHP: October 14, 1971
- Designated NHL: October 16, 2012

The James R. Browning U.S. Court of Appeals Building is a historic post office and courthouse building located at San Francisco, California. It is a courthouse for the United States Court of Appeals for the Ninth Circuit. Completed in 1905 as the U.S. Courthouse and Post Office, it was intended to represent the affluence and increasing importance of the United States as it became a world power. The building survived both the 1906 San Francisco earthquake and the 1989 Loma Prieta earthquake.

== History ==
By the 1870s it became apparent that San Francisco was in dire need of a federal building to house the federal courts and the post office that were located in various downtown buildings. In 1887 a commission delegated to select a site reported that the $350,000 allocated by the U.S. Congress was insufficient and the sum was raised to $1,250,000. The property chosen at Seventh and Mission Streets was more than a mile from the central business district and surrounded by a working-class neighborhood of Irish and German immigrants. Although many disapproved, the lot was purchased in 1891. In 1893 $2,500,000 was appropriated for construction.

U.S. Treasury architects worked on designs for the building, with Supervising Architect James Knox Taylor (1857-1929) playing a lead role. Taylor selected a design influenced by Italian Renaissance architecture with magnificent Beaux Arts grandeur. To achieve the high level of craftsmanship specified for the interior, skilled artisans were brought from Italy, who reportedly later worked on San Simeon. Groundbreaking took place in 1897 and the building opened in 1905 to acclaim as "a post office that's a palace".

On April 18, 1906, an earthquake devastated San Francisco. The courthouse and post office building survived the quake with little damage and thanks to the efforts of postal workers, only one room, now Courtroom 3, the Redwood Room, was damaged by the ensuing fire. It and the 1874 U.S. Mint designed by Alfred B. Mullett were the only buildings south of Market Street to survive the earthquake and resulting fires. While repairs were made, the Post Office set up collection points around the city, with the building serving as a symbol of hope in the weeks following the earthquake. Restoration was completed in 1910.

The building was listed in the National Register of Historic Places in 1971. In 1989 the Loma Prieta earthquake severely damaged the U.S. Courthouse and Post Office. Engineering evaluation started immediately and in 1993 restoration work began, including seismic retrofitting to protect against future earthquakes. The building reopened in 1996 as the U.S. Court of Appeals. In 2005, the building was renamed in honor of Judge James R. Browning. It was declared a National Historic Landmark on October 16, 2012, for its architecture.

== Architecture ==
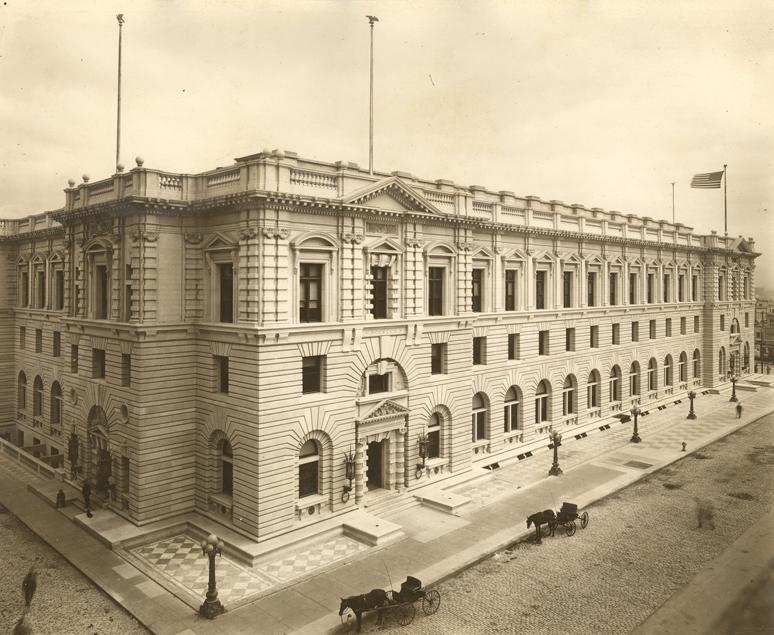
The building as it appeared in 1905.

The building reflects the Beaux Arts classicism adopted by the U.S. Treasury Department for early twentieth-century federal buildings. The stylized building is a steel-framed structure clad in white Sierra granite. The magnificent building, with its opulent ornamentation and surface treatments, was exceptionally lavish even at the time of its construction.

The imposing building, echoing the Italian palazzos designed by Bramante and Raphael during the Renaissance, is ornamented with enclosed pediments, balustrades, and rows of arched windows. The bronze entry lanterns are replicas of the torch-holders designed in 1489 by Niccolo Grosso for the home of Filippo Strozzi, the richest banker in Florence. The building features six lunette mosaics on allegorical themes, designed by artist Earl Stetson Crawford: a group of three representing "Columbia's progress in the arts and sciences during the present century" and another group of three representing "Law and her attributes". Crawford won the commission through an open competition.

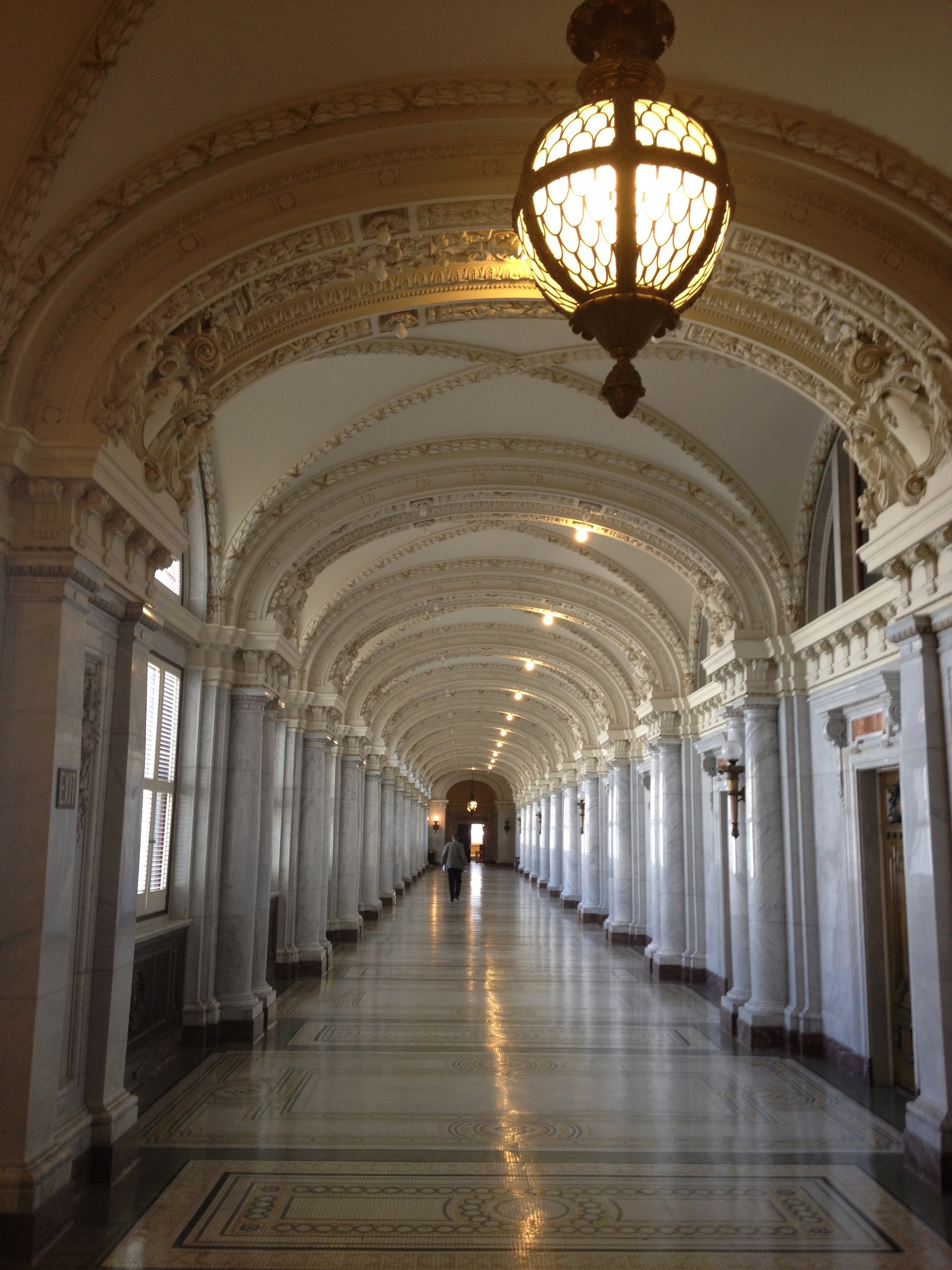
The Great Hall on the third floor of the courthouse.

Originally, the building was a three-story structure with a fourth story, or attic level, set back from the facade and partially hidden behind the cornice and balustrade. This main block of the building was U-shaped with an interior courtyard. The courtyard was ornamented with geometric patterns of red, white, and blue glazed brick walls and one hundred pink-tongued lion heads along the cornice. In order to provide desperately needed office space to meet the needs of the expanding federal bureaucracy, noted San Francisco architect George Kelham (1871-1936) was commissioned in 1933 to design a four-story addition for the east side of the building, enclosing the interior courtyard. The addition repeats the design of the original facades, although the third and fourth stories are veneered in terra cotta.

Although the building's exterior is impressive in the quality of detail, ornamentation, and material, the elegant interiors are even more exquisite. The post office originally occupied the ground floor with a lobby running the width of the Seventh Street (main) facade. The second floor had offices for court staff and federal agencies, while the third floor contained the ornate courtrooms, judicial chambers, and conference rooms.

Rare and exquisite materials on each of the floors of the building include a range of imported marble, such as Carrara and Yellow Siena from Italy, Pacific Coast Salmon Pink, and Red Numidian from North Africa. The grand first-floor hall, accessible through massive bronze doors, is paneled in black-veined white Italian marble trimmed in green marble from Maryland and Vermont. Marble mosaics adorn the groin-vaulted ceiling. The floor is composed of ceramic-tile mosaic. Stained-glass domes ringed with marble-mosaic tile eagles enhance the rotundas at each end of the hall.

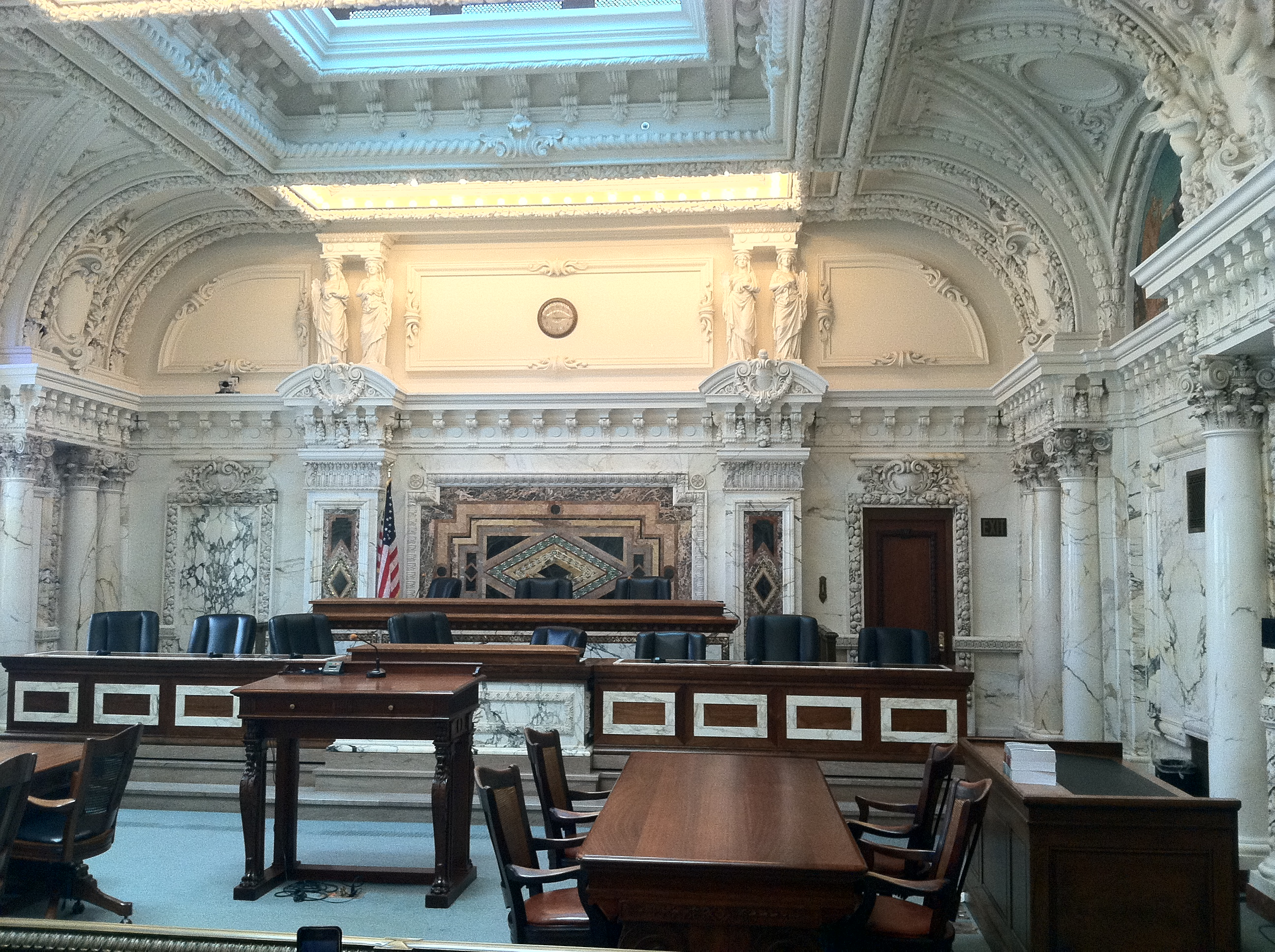
Courtroom One

The Great Hall, located on the third floor, is adorned with white marble walls, Doric order columns, and a vaulted ceiling beautifully ribbed with gold trimmed plaster ornamentation. This hall leads to Courtroom One, the most elaborate interior space in the building. Originally designed for the U.S. District Court, Courtroom One features Marble mosaics, columns with carved Composite capitals, carved fruit motifs, cast-plaster cupids and flowers, and stained-glass windows. In contrast to the opulence of the Beaux Arts designed spaces, the two courtrooms on the second floor of the 1933-1934 addition are designed in the sleek Moderne style. Detailing in these spaces include the labyrinth-patterned ceiling, cork walls, and gilded plaster eagles.

Additions and renovations took place throughout its history, including an extensive restoration project overseen by Judge Richard H. Chambers during the 1960s. The Loma Prieta earthquake of 1989 caused major damage, initiating a $91,000,000 seismic retrofitting and restoration effort. In addition to the installation of base isolators, the project, led by the architectural firm of Skidmore, Owings & Merrill, included repairs, modernization, and restoration and the addition of 45,000 square feet (4,200 m^{2}) of space for a law library and offices in the former Post Office area. The building formally reopened as the U.S. Court of Appeals Building for the Ninth Circuit on October 17, 1996, the seventh anniversary of the Loma Prieta earthquake.

== Significant events ==
- 1887: U.S. Congress authorizes the construction of a courthouse and post office in San Francisco
- 1897–1905: The U.S. Courthouse and Post Office is constructed under direction of Supervising Architect of the Treasury James Knox Taylor
- 1906: Despite the devastating destruction of San Francisco by an earthquake on April 18, the U.S. Courthouse and Post Office survives
- 1910: Repairs of earthquake damage to the U.S. Courthouse and Post Office are completed
- 1933–1934: A four-story wing, designed by San Francisco architect George Kelham, is constructed on the east side of building
- 1959: Judge Richard H. Chambers is appointed court custodian and oversees the restoration of the building
- 1964: The building is renamed the U.S. Court of Appeals and Post Office
- 1971: The building is listed in the National Register of Historic Places
- 1989–1996: Extensive restoration, renovation, and seismic retrofitting of the building are undertaken as a result of the 1989 Loma Prieta earthquake
- 1996: Building reopens as the U.S. Court of Appeals for the Ninth Circuit
- 2005: Building renamed during centennial celebrations in honor of Judge James R. Browning, circuit judge since 1961
- 2012: Building is declared a National Historic Landmark

== Building facts ==
- Architects: James Knox Taylor, Supervising Architect of the Treasury
- East addition: George Kelham
- Courtyard addition: Skidmore, Owings, & Merrill
- Construction dates: 1897–1905; 1933–1934; 1993–96
- Landmark status: Listed in the National Register of Historic Places
- Location: 95 Seventh Street
- Architectural style: Beaux Arts
- Primary materials: White Sierra granite courtyards and addition clad in white ceramic-faced brick
- Prominent features: Great hall; Courtrooms with marble and mosaic ornamentation

== See also ==
- List of United States post offices
