= Kenneth K. Lee =

American judge (born 1975)

Kenneth Lee
- 이기열
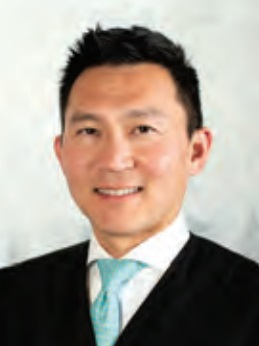

Judge of the United States Court of Appeals for the Ninth Circuit
- Incumbent
- Assumed office June 12, 2019
- Appointed by: Donald Trump
- Preceded by: Stephen Reinhardt

Personal details
- Born: Lee Kiyul; August 30, 1975 (age 50) Seoul, South Korea
- Education: Cornell University (BA); Harvard University (JD)

Korean name
- Hangul: 이기열
- Hanja: 李氣熱
- RR: I Giyeol
- MR: I Kiyŏl

Kenneth Kiyul Lee (Korean: 이기열; born August 30, 1975) is a South Korean-born American lawyer who serves as a United States circuit judge of the United States Court of Appeals for the Ninth Circuit.

== Early life and education ==
Lee was born in 1975 in Seoul, South Korea. Lee's family immigrated to the United States when he was four years old, following the 1979 military coup in South Korea. Lee grew up in the Koreatown neighborhood of Los Angeles. His father operated a spray paint equipment repair shop, and his mother was a pharmacist and acupuncturist. Neither of Lee’s parents spoke English, but they insisted that he understand the language and did not allow him to attend a Korean church for that reason.

After high school, Lee studied government at Cornell University, where he wrote for the conservative and libertarian campus newspaper The Cornell Review. He graduated in 1997 with a Bachelor of Arts degree summa cum laude and was elected to Phi Beta Kappa. Lee then attended Harvard Law School, graduating in 2000 with a Juris Doctor magna cum laude.

== Early legal career ==
After graduating from law school, Lee served as a law clerk to Judge Emilio M. Garza of the United States Court of Appeals for the Fifth Circuit from 2000 to 2001. Lee then worked as an associate at New York City law firm Wachtell, Lipton, Rosen & Katz from 2001 to 2006. At Wachtell, following the September 11 attacks, Lee served as second chair, deposed witnesses, and wrote briefs as part of the legal team representing real estate mogul Larry Silverstein, whose 99-year lease of the World Trade Center provided a $3.5 billion insurance policy for an act of terrorism. The court ruled that the separate plane crashes in the World Trade Center represented 1.4 occurrences of terrorism.

In 2005, Lee served as a special counsel on the United States Senate Judiciary Committee. From 2006 to 2009, Lee was Associate Counsel and Special Assistant to President George W. Bush. After Bush left office in 2009, Lee joined the Los Angeles office of the law firm Jenner & Block as a partner. From 2010 to 2011, Lee served as an adjunct faculty member at Pepperdine University School of Law.

Lee has litigated consumer class action lawsuits across the United States in the food, technology, and health care sectors. He has argued appeals before a number of federal circuit courts. In his pro bono practice, Lee has represented a number of indigent and incarcerated individuals. He is a member of the Food Law Committee of the Litigation Section of the State Bar of California. In 2018, Lee was named one of the "Most Influential Minority Attorneys" by the Los Angeles Business Journal.

== Federal judicial service ==
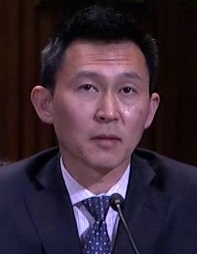
Lee at his confirmation hearing on March 13, 2019

On October 10, 2018, President Donald Trump announced his intent to nominate Lee to serve as a United States Circuit Judge of the United States Court of Appeals for the Ninth Circuit. Both California Senators Dianne Feinstein and Kamala Harris announced their opposition to his nomination. On November 13, 2018, his nomination was sent to the Senate. President Trump nominated Lee to the seat vacated by Judge Stephen Reinhardt, who died on March 29, 2018.

On January 3, 2019, his nomination was returned to the President under Rule XXXI, Paragraph 6 of the United States Senate.

On January 30, 2019, President Trump indicated that he would renominate Lee to a Ninth Circuit vacancy. On February 6, 2019, his nomination was sent to the Senate. On March 13, 2019, a hearing on his nomination was held before the Senate Judiciary Committee. During the hearing, he was questioned about college writings covering AIDS, political correctness, and feminism. He apologized for some of the writings, saying he regretted them and was embarrassed by them. The Wall Street Journal editorial board responded to the questioning about Lee's college writings: "...what Mr. Lee wrote in college is of no relevance to how he’d behave as a jurist. ... What liberals really don’t like is that Mr. Lee dissented from progressive doctrines on racial preferences, among other issues."

On April 4, 2019, his nomination was reported out of committee by a 12–10 vote. On May 14, 2019, the Senate invoked cloture on his nomination by a 50–45 vote. On May 15, 2019, his nomination was confirmed by a 52–45 vote. He received his judicial commission on June 12, 2019. Lee is the nation's first Article III judge who was born in the Republic of Korea and the second Korean American to serve on the Ninth Circuit.

In August 2020, Lee was part of a three-judge panel who held that California's "large capacity magazine ban" was unconstitutional.

== Memberships ==
Lee is listed as an expert for the Federalist Society and has been a speaker and panelist on the topics of Food & Drug Law, Class Action lawsuits, and the Constitutionality of the Affordable Care Act.

== See also ==
- List of Asian American jurists

Legal offices
Preceded by Stephen Reinhardt	Judge of the United States Court of Appeals for the Ninth Circuit; 2019–present	Incumbent
