= John Roberts =

Chief Justice of the United States since 2005

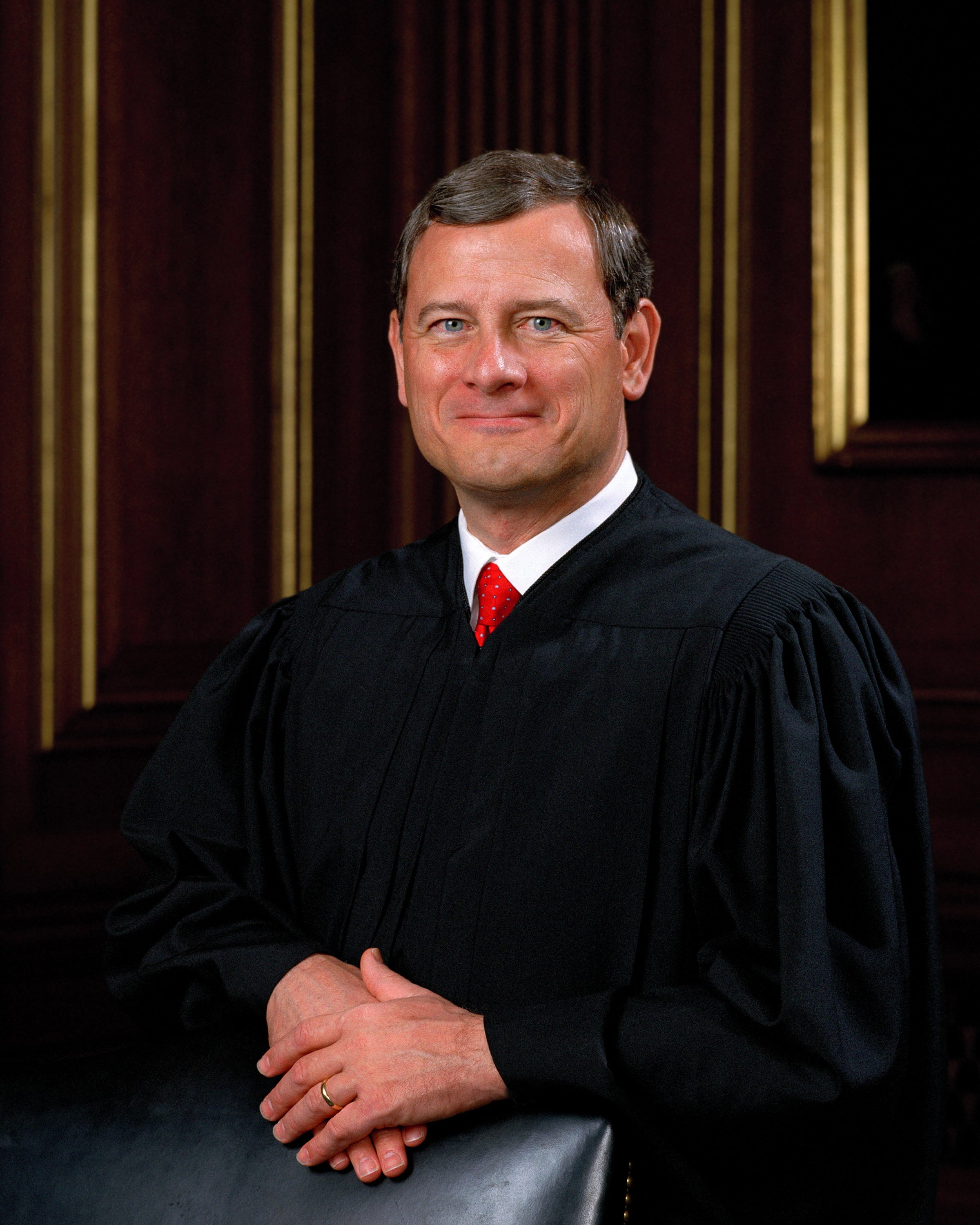
- Official portrait, 2005

17th Chief Justice of the United States
- Incumbent
- Assumed office September 29, 2005
- Nominated by: George W. Bush
- Preceded by: William Rehnquist

Judge of the United States Court of Appeals for the District of Columbia Circuit
- In office June 2, 2003 – September 29, 2005
- Nominated by: George W. Bush
- Preceded by: James L. Buckley
- Succeeded by: Patricia Millett

Principal Deputy Solicitor General of the United States
- In office October 24, 1989 – January 20, 1993
- President: George H. W. Bush
- Preceded by: Donald B. Ayer
- Succeeded by: Paul Bender

Associate Counsel to the President
- In office November 28, 1982 – April 11, 1986
- President: Ronald Reagan
- Preceded by: J. Michael Luttig
- Succeeded by: Robert Kruger

Personal details
- Born: John Glover Roberts Jr. January 27, 1955 (age 71) Buffalo, New York, U.S.
- Spouse: Jane Sullivan (m. 1996)
- Children: 2
- Education: Harvard University (BA, JD)
- Awards: Henry J. Friendly Medal (2023)
- Roberts's voice John Roberts delivers the opinion of the Court in United States v. Rahimi. Recorded June 21, 2024

John Glover Roberts Jr. (born January 27, 1955) is an American jurist who has served since 2005 as the 17th chief justice of the United States. Though primarily an institutionalist, he has been described as having a moderate conservative judicial philosophy. Regarded as a swing vote in some cases, Roberts has presided over an ideological shift toward conservative jurisprudence on the high court, in which he has authored key opinions.

Born in Buffalo, New York, Roberts was raised Catholic in Northwest Indiana and studied at Harvard University, initially intending to become a historian. He graduated from Harvard College with highest distinction, then attended Harvard Law School, where he was the managing editor of the Harvard Law Review. After law school, he served as a law clerk to Judge Henry Friendly and Justice William Rehnquist and held positions in the Department of Justice from 1989 to 1993 during the presidencies of Ronald Reagan and George H. W. Bush. He then became a partner at a law firm and built a leading appellate practice, arguing 39 cases before the Supreme Court.

In 1992, President George H. W. Bush nominated Roberts to the U.S. Court of Appeals for the District of Columbia Circuit, but the Senate did not hold a vote on his confirmation. In 2003, President George W. Bush appointed Roberts to the D.C. Circuit. In 2005, Bush nominated Roberts to the Supreme Court, initially as an associate justice to fill the vacancy left by Justice Sandra Day O'Connor but then as chief justice after Rehnquist's death. Roberts was confirmed by a Senate vote of 78–22. Aged 50, he was the youngest chief justice since John Marshall.

As chief justice, Roberts has authored majority opinions in many landmark cases, including National Federation of Independent Business v. Sebelius (upholding most sections of the Affordable Care Act), Shelby County v. Holder (limiting the Voting Rights Act of 1965), Trump v. Hawaii (expanding presidential powers over immigration), Carpenter v. United States (expanding digital privacy), Students for Fair Admissions v. Harvard (overruling race-based admission programs), and Trump v. United States (outlining the extent of presidential immunity from criminal prosecution). Roberts also presided over President Donald Trump's first impeachment trial.

== Early life and education ==
Roberts was born on January 27, 1955, in Buffalo, New York, to Rosemary (née Podrasky) and John Glover "Jack" Roberts Sr., both devout Catholics. His father had Irish and Welsh ancestry and his mother was a descendant of Slovak immigrants from Szepes, Hungary. He has two younger sisters, Margaret and Barbara; an elder sister, Kathy, died in 2021. Roberts spent his early childhood years in Hamburg, New York, where his father worked as an electrical engineer for the Bethlehem Steel Corporation's factory in Lackawanna.

In 1965, ten-year-old Roberts and his family moved to Long Beach, Indiana, where his father became the manager of a new steel plant in nearby Burns Harbor. By age 13, Roberts "already had a clear plan for his life." He attended the parochial La Lumiere School, an academically rigorous Catholic boarding school in La Porte, Indiana, where he captained the school's football team, participated in track and field, and was a regional champion in wrestling. He also participated in choir and drama, and was a co-editor of the school newspaper. He graduated in 1973 as class valedictorian, becoming the first graduate of the La Lumiere School to attend Harvard.

At Harvard College, Roberts dedicated himself to studying history, his academic major. He had entered Harvard as a sophomore with second-year standing based on his academic achievements in high school. Roberts first roomed in Straus Hall before moving to Leverett House. Every summer, he returned home to work at the steel plant his father managed. Although he initially felt obscured among other students, Roberts distinguished himself with professors, meriting multiple distinctions for his scholarly writing. He gained a reputation as a serious student who valued formality. Every Sunday, he attended Catholic Mass at St. Paul Church.

As an undergraduate, Roberts excelled academically. He focused on modern European history and maintained an interest in politics. In his first year, he won the university's Edwards Whitaker Scholarship for outstanding scholastic achievement. He intended to pursue a Ph.D. in history to be a professor but also contemplated a legal career. One of Roberts's first papers, "Marxism and Bolshevism: Theory and Practice," won Harvard's William Scott Ferguson Prize for the most outstanding essay by a sophomore history major. An early interest in oral advocacy also led him to study the 19th-century lawyer and statesman Daniel Webster, a prominent advocate before the Supreme Court. His senior year paper, "The Utopian Conservative: A Study of Continuity and Change in the Thought of Daniel Webster," won a Bowdoin Prize.

In 1976, Roberts obtained his Bachelor of Arts degree in history, summa cum laude, and was elected to Phi Beta Kappa. A recent surplus of history graduate students convinced him to attend Harvard Law School for better career prospects, though he maintained his original goal to become a professor. (Note: Roberts turned down an offer to pursue a doctorate in history at Harvard on a full scholarship.) His first-year performance in law school placed him in the top 15 students in a class of 550 and won him membership on the Harvard Law Review. The journal's president, David Leebron, chose Roberts as its managing editor, despite their differing political views. (Note: Roberts's colleagues on the Harvard Law Review also included Jane C. Ginsburg, the daughter of Judge Ruth Bader Ginsburg.) Classmate David Wilkins described Roberts as "more conservative than the typical Harvard Law student in the 1970s" but well-liked by fellow students. In 1979, Roberts graduated at the top of his class with a Juris Doctor, magna cum laude, despite once having to admit himself to a local hospital due to exhaustion. He later regretted that he traveled to Boston on only a couple of occasions during his time at Harvard, being too preoccupied with his studies.

== Early legal career ==
After graduating from law school, Roberts was a law clerk for Judge Henry Friendly, (Note: Harvard students considered a clerkship with Friendly to be "the gold standard"; Charles Davidow, a fellow member of the Harvard Law Review, described Roberts as "a superstar in law school, and the fact that Friendly picked him would be testament to that".) one of the most influential judges of the century, at the U.S. Court of Appeals for the Second Circuit from 1979 to 1980. Friendly was impressed by Roberts's performance; they shared similar backgrounds, and co-clerk Reinier Kraakman recalled that "there was a bond between them." When Roberts became a federal judge years later, he identified with Friendly's nonpartisan approach to law and maintained a correspondence with him. (Note: Roberts has considered Friendly "the most influential figure in his life." During his Supreme Court confirmation hearings in 2005, Roberts later testified about Friendly: "He had such a total commitment to excellence in his craft, at every stage of the process. Just a total devotion to the rule of law and the confidence that if you just worked hard enough at it, you'd come up with the right answers.") After finishing his clerkship at the Second Circuit in May, Roberts went to clerk for Justice (later Chief Justice) William Rehnquist at the U.S. Supreme Court from 1980 to 1981.

At the end of his clerkship with Rehnquist, Roberts worked to gain admission to the bar, studying with Michael W. McConnell, a law clerk of Justice William Brennan. After the 1980 presidential election, he resolved to work under the new Reagan administration. Rehnquist recommended him to Ken Starr, who was chief of staff to attorney general William French Smith, and Roberts was named a special assistant to the attorney general. After being admitted to the District of Columbia bar and arriving to the Department of Justice in August 1981, he helped Sandra Day O'Connor prepare for her confirmation hearings. (Note: Starr chose Roberts to assist O'Connor in matters concerning abortion during her hearings before the Senate Judiciary Committee. Roberts later recalled that "the approach was to avoid giving specific responses to any direct questions on legal issues likely to come before the court, but demonstrating in the response a firm command of the subject area and awareness of the relevant precedents and arguments." O'Connor later received widespread support and was confirmed 99–0 on September 21, 1981.)

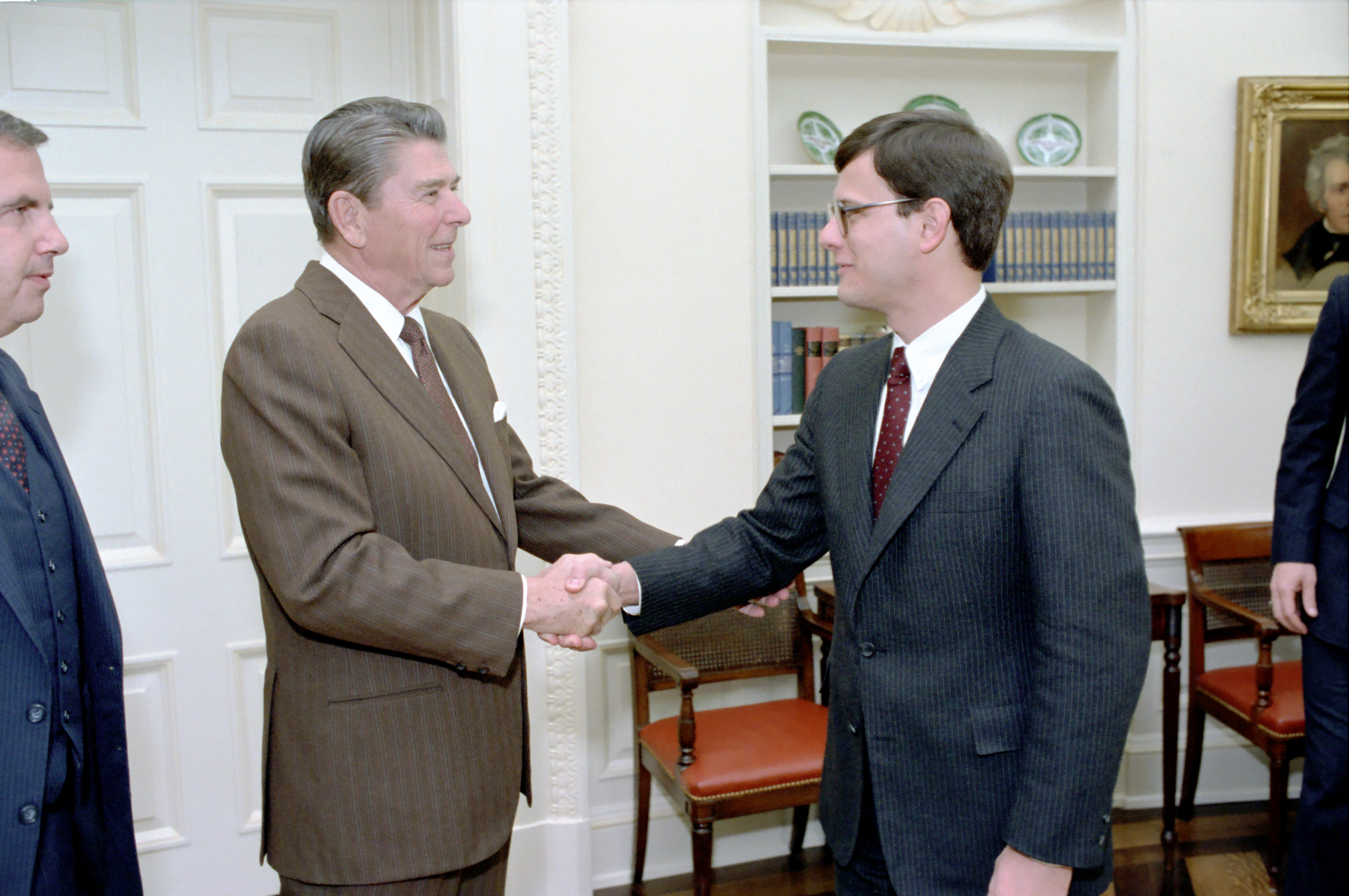
President Ronald Reagan greeting Roberts in the Oval Office while Roberts was serving as an associate White House Counsel (1983)

As an assistant to the attorney general, Roberts concentrated on the scope of the Voting Rights Act of 1965, especially Section 2 and Section 5, both of which Roberts and other Reagan lawyers believed to have unnecessarily intruded on state regulations. He wrote to Friendly, "this is an exciting time to be at the Justice Department, when so much that has been taken for granted for so long is being seriously reconsidered." Among those he worked with were William Bradford Reynolds in the Civil Rights Division, former classmate Richard Lazarus, J. Harvie Wilkinson III, Theodore Olson, and fellow special assistant Carolyn Kuhl.

In 1982, Reagan advisor Fred Fielding recruited Roberts to work at the White House. Fielding gathered a group of lawyers, including J. Michael Luttig and Henry Garrett. From 1982 to 1986, Roberts was an associate with the White House Counsel. He then entered private practice in Washington, D.C., as an associate at the law firm Hogan & Hartson (now Hogan Lovells), working in corporate law. E. Barrett Prettyman Jr., under whom he was first assigned, was one of the most prominent advocates in the country along with Rex E. Lee. Roberts also built a successful practice as an appellate lawyer, heading the firm's division for appellate advocacy. He made his first appearance before the Supreme Court in United States v. Halper, arguing against the government, and the Court unanimously upheld his arguments.

== Appellate advocacy ==
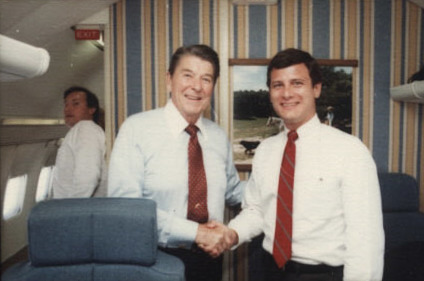
Roberts with President Reagan on Air Force One in 1985

In 1989, Ken Starr relinquished his judgeship on the D.C. Circuit to become U.S. Solicitor General under President George H. W. Bush. Needing a deputy, Starr chose Roberts to join the administration as Principal Deputy Solicitor General. "I felt that his experience was good for the political deputy position. [Roberts] was a steady hand, a wise hand. He came in as a person not of vast experience but of vast ability," Starr recalled. With the new appointment, Roberts, whose work had previously been confidential, became a prominent figure at the Supreme Court, leading the filings of the Bush administration and representing it in the media.

As deputy solicitor general, Roberts frequently appeared before the Supreme Court. He argued for a number of conservative positions, including those against abortion, an extensive federal jurisdiction, and policies that afforded special benefits to minority groups. In 1990, he successfully argued his first case in Atlantic Richfield Company v. USA Petroleum Company, which concerned anti-trust law, and then successfully argued the standing case of Lujan v. National Wildlife Federation, which became a hallmark in the field. When Starr recused himself in Metro Broadcasting, Inc. v. FCC, Roberts took his place, arguing that the use of racial preferences by the Federal Communications Commission (FCC) was unconstitutional. The position failed to convince the Court, which announced on June 27, 1990, that it had sided with the FCC. Government attorneys, surprised by Roberts's stance against the FCC, discussed whether it contributed to a politicization of the office, as the Solicitor General traditionally defended the government. Thomas Merrill, a deputy for the Solicitor General, described Roberts's candid position simply as: "This affirmative action program violated the Constitution, and we should present that to the Supreme Court."

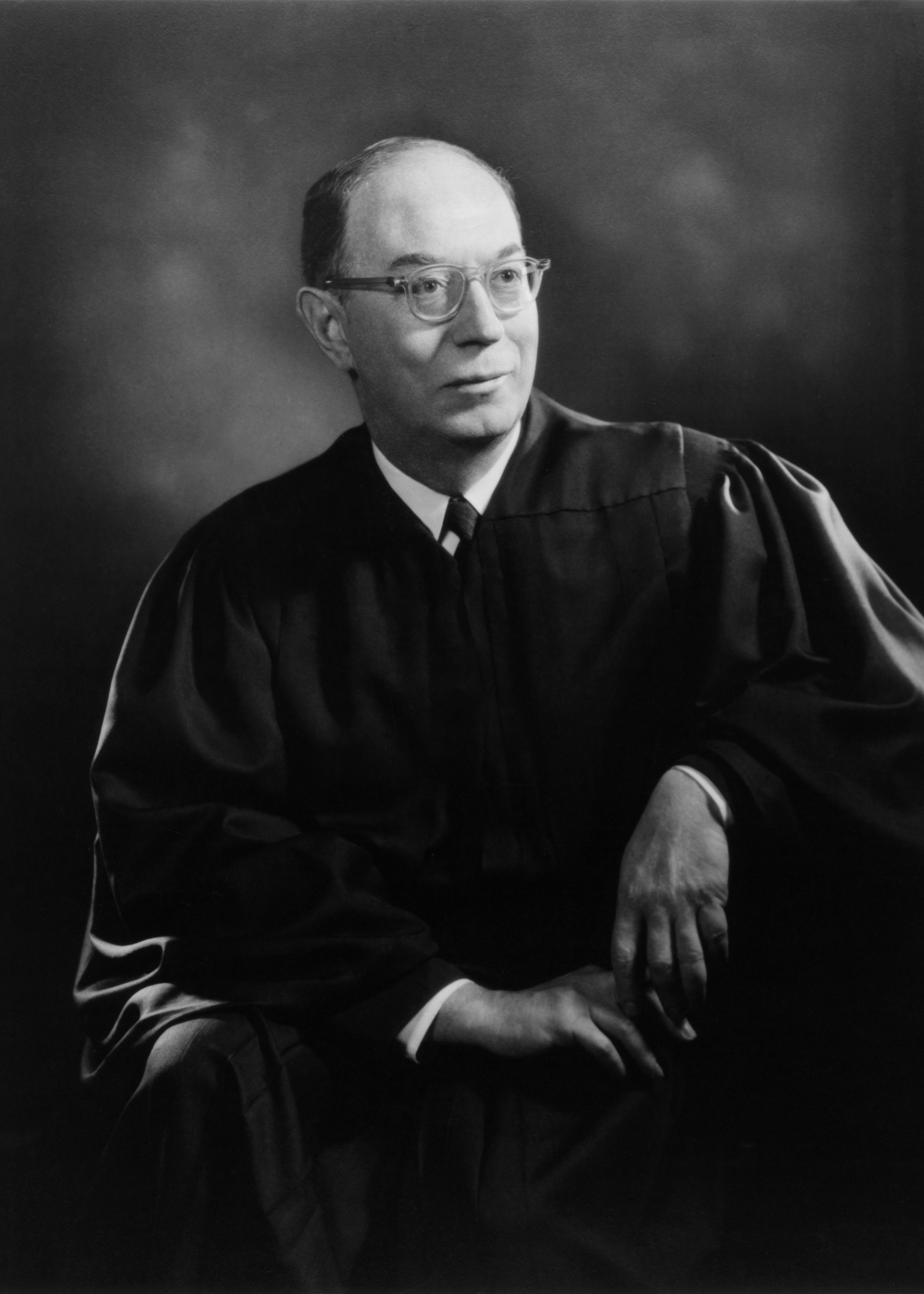
Roberts idolized his judicial mentor, Judge Henry Friendly, and described Friendly as the "exemplar of judicial modesty".

When Clarence Thomas was confirmed to the Supreme Court in 1991, Roberts's proven experience in complex litigation for the Bush administration made him a leading candidate to fill Thomas's vacancy on the U.S. Court of Appeals for the District of Columbia. On January 27, 1992, Bush nominated Roberts, who had just turned 37 years old, to the D.C. Circuit, and Starr urged Senator Joe Biden, chair of the Senate Judiciary Committee, to schedule a hearing despite an upcoming election year. Democratic lobbyists and progressive interest groups successfully encouraged Biden to stall the process. As Bill Clinton defeated Bush in the 1992 presidential election, Roberts's nomination lapsed with no Senate vote and expired at the end of the 102nd Congress.

In January 1993, Roberts returned to Hogan and Hartson, where, finding great success as an advocate, he began to regularly appear before the Supreme Court. With a reputation as the leading private Supreme Court litigator, Roberts often represented corporations that sued individuals or the government. He was Hogan and Hartson's most prominent partner, arguing 18 Supreme Court cases from 1993 to 2003 and 20 in nationwide appellate courts while also doing work pro bono, demonstrating expertise in a wide variety of different fields.

In June 1995, to Roberts's satisfaction, the Supreme Court overruled his previous loss of Metro Broadcasting, Inc. v. FCC in Adarand Constructors, Inc. v. Peña, establishing that the government must treat people on an individual basis. The next year, his pro bono contributions included giving fundamental aid to gay rights activists in the landmark case of Romer v. Evans (1996). During the 2000 presidential election, Roberts went to Florida to assist George W. Bush, by which time Jeffrey Toobin identified him as "among the top advocates of his generation". According to biographer Joan Biskupic, he built a reputation "for his powers of persuasion and tireless preparation", and "his meticulous preparation and unflagging composure inspired confidence among his well-heeled clients." His arguments against government regulation often appealed to Rehnquist and the Court's conservatives while his style and skill in rhetoric won him the respect of John Paul Stevens and the Court's liberals. Democrats and Republicans alike widely viewed Roberts as one of the most distinguished advocates to appear before the Supreme Court.

Selected cases
Case	Argued	Decided	Represented
First Options v. Kaplan, 514 U.S. 938	March 22, 1995	May 22, 1995	Respondent
Adams v. Robertson, 520 U.S. 83	January 14, 1997	March 3, 1997	Respondent
Alaska v. Native Village of Venetie Tribal Government, 522 U.S. 520	December 10, 1997	February 25, 1999	Petitioner
Feltner v. Columbia Pictures Television, Inc., 523 U.S. 340	January 21, 1998	March 31, 1998	Petitioner
National Collegiate Athletic Association v. Smith, 525 U.S. 459	January 20, 1999	February 23, 1999	Petitioner
Rice v. Cayetano, 528 U.S. 495	October 6, 1999	February 23, 2000	Respondent
Eastern Associated Coal Corp. v. Mine Workers, 531 U.S. 57	October 2, 2000	November 28, 2000	Petitioner
TrafFix Devices, Inc. v. Marketing Displays, Inc., 532 U.S. 23	November 29, 2000	March 20, 2001	Petitioner
Toyota Motor Manufacturing v. Williams, 534 U.S. 184	November 7, 2001	January 8, 2002	Petitioner
Tahoe-Sierra Preservation Council, Inc. v. Tahoe Regional Planning Agency, 535 U.S. 302	January 7, 2002	April 23, 2002	Respondent
Rush Prudential HMO, Inc. v. Moran, 536 U.S. 355	January 16, 2002	June 20, 2002	Petitioner
Gonzaga University v. Doe, 536 U.S. 273	April 24, 2002	June 20, 2002	Petitioner
Barnhart v. Peabody Coal Co., 537 U.S. 149	October 8, 2002	January 15, 2003	Respondent
Smith v. Doe, 538 U.S. 84	November 13, 2002	March 5, 2003	Petitioner

== U.S. Court of Appeals for the District of Columbia Circuit ==
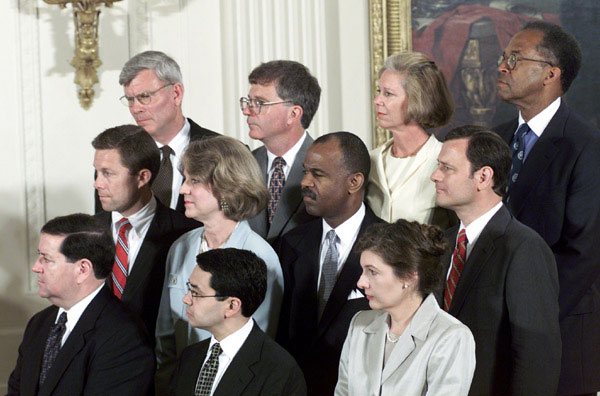
Roberts (second row, rightmost) listens with other candidates as Bush announces their judicial nominations in May 2001.

When George W. Bush won the contested 2000 presidential election, journalists speculated about whom he might consider as possible nominees for the Supreme Court. Luttig, Wilkinson, and other Reagan officials were leading candidates, but Judge Alberto Gonzales of the Texas Supreme Court, a close supporter of Bush, also emerged and had a chance to be the first Latino nominee. Roberts, who had not worked in government while Bill Clinton was in office, did not appear on lists compiled by Bush supporters, advocacy groups, or the media, but nonetheless remained a strong candidate for a Republican nomination and was poised to be re-nominated to the D.C. Circuit, which is often a platform for Supreme Court nomination.

On May 9, 2001, Bush nominated Roberts to a seat on the U.S. Court of Appeals for the District of Columbia Circuit to replace Judge James L. Buckley, who had retired. Unlike in 1992 when his first nomination stalled in the Democratic-majority Senate, Roberts's nomination came when Republicans had secured a one-vote Senate majority. But it soon lost that majority when Senator Jim Jeffords left the party to become an independent, jeopardizing Roberts's candidacy, which stalled once again when Senate Democrats refused to hold any nomination hearings. In 2002, Republicans regained control of the Senate and Roberts finally received a hearing by the Senate Judiciary Committee.

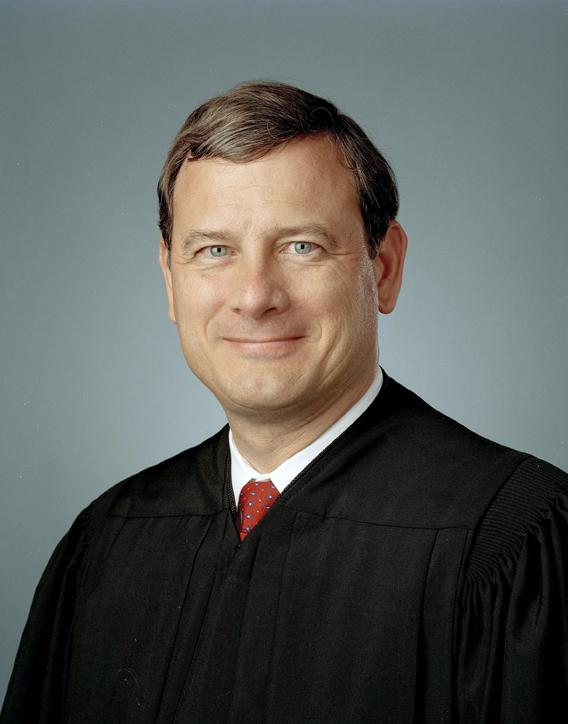
Roberts as a judge on the U.S. Court of Appeals for the District of Columbia Circuit (c. 2003)

Supported by a bipartisan letter of support signed by more than 150 members of the District of Columbia Bar—including White House counsels Lloyd Cutler, C. Boyden Gray, and Solicitor General Seth Waxman—the Judiciary Committee recommended Roberts by a vote of 16 to 3, (Note: Democrats Ted Kennedy (Massachusetts), Chuck Schumer (New York), and Dick Durbin (Illinois) were those who opposed Roberts's nomination.) and the Senate confirmed him unanimously by voice vote on May 8, 2003. On June 2, he received his judicial commission. Even when Roberts had not yet fully assumed his role as a circuit judge, White House Counsel officers listed him on their shortlist of Supreme Court candidates.

Roberts authored 49 opinions during his two-year service on the D.C. Circuit, many of which concerned decisions by the Federal Communications Commission and the Federal Energy Regulatory Commission. According to biographer Joan Biskupic, his opinions often employed a "characteristically crisp, clear writing style" that favored the use of imagery and idioms. (Note: Roberts, like some other judges on the D.C. Circuit, borrowed from classical works in writing his opinions, and he often quoted Voltaire, Ralph Waldo Emerson, and Homer. According to legal scholar Laura Krugman Ray, he was intent on "finding ways to leaven his utilitarian prose with personalized elements of diction, metaphor, allusion, syntax, and tone.") Most of the disputes he reviewed concerned government regulation, union rights, and collective bargaining, but he also wrote on environmental law, (Note: Including two important decisions, firstly in Sierra Club v. EPA (2004), rejecting claims of an environmental rights group that the Environmental Protection Agency (EPA) should have enforced stricter measures on air pollution, then in Independent Equipment Dealers Association v. EPA (2004), concerning the EPA's role under the Administrative Procedure Act.) criminal law, (Note: Usually ruling in favor of the government, including in United States v. Bolla (2003), which upheld a harsh securities fraud sentence, and in United States v. Lawson (2005), which affirmed a bank robbery conviction based on photo identification.) and procedural matters. One case, Hedgepeth ex rel. Hedgepeth v. Washington Metropolitan Area Transit (2004), garnered media attention when Roberts found that Washington police properly detained a 12-year-old girl who ate in violation of a zero tolerance policy against eating in a metro station. His opinions generally reflected a conservative judicial philosophy, including in areas of civil rights and executive power.

== Nomination to the Supreme Court of the United States (2005) ==
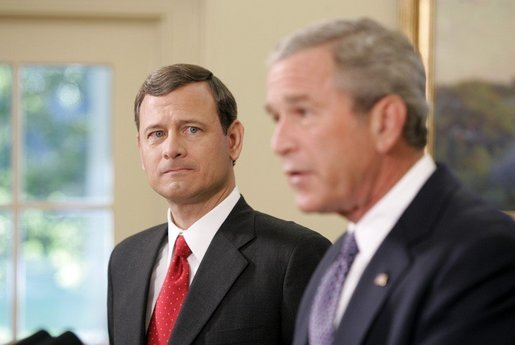
President George W. Bush announces Roberts's nomination to be Chief Justice (2005).

By the time of the 2004 presidential election, Justice Rehnquist was terminally ill, and senior Bush administration advisors under Karl Rove began assessing potential candidates to replace him. Among them, Roberts stood out for his experience as a Supreme Court advocate, which had brought him the favorable attention of not just conservatives but also liberals such as Ruth Bader Ginsburg.

On July 19, 2005, President Bush nominated Roberts to the U.S. Supreme Court to fill a vacancy to be created by the impending retirement of Justice Sandra Day O'Connor. Roberts's nomination was the first Supreme Court nomination since Stephen Breyer's in 1994. On September 3, 2005, while Roberts's confirmation was pending before the Senate, Chief Justice William H. Rehnquist died. Two days later, Bush withdrew Roberts's nomination as O'Connor's successor and nominated Roberts to succeed Rehnquist as chief justice.

=== Roberts's testimony on his jurisprudence ===
During his confirmation hearings, Roberts said he did not have a comprehensive jurisprudential philosophy and did "not think beginning with an all-encompassing approach to constitutional interpretation is the best way to faithfully construe the document." Roberts compared judges to baseball umpires: "[I]t's my job to call balls and strikes, and not to pitch or bat." Among the issues he discussed during the hearings were:

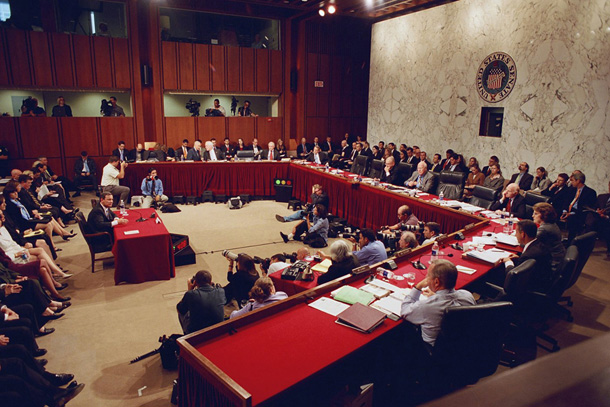
Roberts testifying before the Senate Judiciary Committee

==== Commerce Clause ====
In Senate hearings, Roberts said:

Starting with McCulloch v. Maryland, Chief Justice John Marshall gave a very broad and expansive reading to the powers of the federal government and explained generally that if the ends be legitimate, then any means chosen to achieve them are within the power of the federal government, and cases interpreting that, throughout the years, have come down. Certainly, by the time Lopez was decided, many of us had learned in law school that it was just sort of a formality to say that interstate commerce was affected and that cases weren't going to be thrown out that way. Lopez certainly breathed new life into the Commerce Clause. I think it remains to be seen, in subsequent decisions, how rigorous a showing, and in many cases, it is just a showing. It's not a question of an abstract fact—does this affect interstate commerce or not—but has this body, the Congress, demonstrated the impact on interstate commerce that drove them to legislate? That's a very important factor. It wasn't present in Lopez at all. I think the members of Congress had heard the same thing I had heard in law school, that this is unimportant—and they hadn't gone through the process of establishing a record in that case.

==== Federalism ====
Roberts said the following about federalism in a 1999 radio interview:

We have gotten to the point these days where we think the only way we can show we're serious about a problem is if we pass a federal law, whether it is the Violence Against Women Act or anything else. The fact of the matter is conditions are different in different states, and state laws can be more—relevant is I think exactly the right term, more attuned to the different situations in New York, as opposed to Minnesota, and that is what the federal system is based on.

==== Reviewing Acts of Congress ====
At a Senate hearing, Roberts said:

The Supreme Court has, throughout its history, on many occasions described the deference that is due to legislative judgments. Justice Holmes described assessing the constitutionality of an act of Congress as the gravest duty that the Supreme Court is called upon to perform. ... It's a principle that is easily stated and needs to be observed in practice, as well as in theory. Now, the Court, of course, has the obligation, and has been recognized since Marbury v. Madison, to assess the constitutionality of acts of Congress, and when those acts are challenged, it is the obligation of the Court to say what the law is. The determination of when deference to legislative policy judgments goes too far and becomes abdication of the judicial responsibility, and when scrutiny of those judgments goes too far on the part of the judges and becomes what I think is properly called judicial activism—that is certainly the central dilemma of having an unelected, as you describe it correctly, undemocratic judiciary in a democratic republic.

==== Stare decisis ====
On the subject of stare decisis, referring to Brown v. Board of Education, the decision overturning school segregation, Roberts said: "the Court in that case, of course, overruled a prior decision. I don't think that constitutes judicial activism because obviously if the decision is wrong, it should be overruled. That's not activism. That's applying the law correctly."

==== Roe v. Wade ====
As a lawyer for the Reagan administration, Roberts wrote legal memos defending administration policies on abortion. At his nomination hearing, he testified that the legal memos represented the views of the administration he was representing at the time and not necessarily his own. "I was a staff lawyer; I didn't have a position," Roberts said. As a lawyer in the George H. W. Bush administration, Roberts signed a legal brief urging the court to overturn Roe v. Wade.

In private meetings with senators before his confirmation, Roberts testified that Roe was settled law, but added that it was subject to the legal principle of stare decisis, meaning that while the Court must give some weight to the precedent, it was not legally bound to uphold it.

In his Senate testimony, Roberts said that, while sitting on the Appellate Court, he had an obligation to respect precedents established by the Supreme Court, including the right to abortion. He said: "Roe v. Wade is the settled law of the land. ... There is nothing in my personal views that would prevent me from fully and faithfully applying that precedent, as well as Casey." Following nominees' traditional reluctance to indicate which way they might vote on an issue likely to come before the Supreme Court, he did not explicitly say whether he would vote to overturn either. Jeffrey Rosen said, "I wouldn't bet on Chief Justice Roberts's siding unequivocally with the anti-Roe forces."

=== Confirmation ===
On September 22, 2005, the Senate Judiciary Committee approved Roberts's nomination by a vote of 13–5, with senators Ted Kennedy, Richard Durbin, Charles Schumer, Joe Biden, and Dianne Feinstein opposed. The full Senate confirmed Roberts on September 29 by a margin of 78–22. All Republicans and the one independent voted for Roberts; the Democrats split evenly, 22–22. Roberts was confirmed by what was, historically, a narrow margin for a Supreme Court justice, but all subsequent confirmation votes have been even narrower.

== U.S. Supreme Court ==
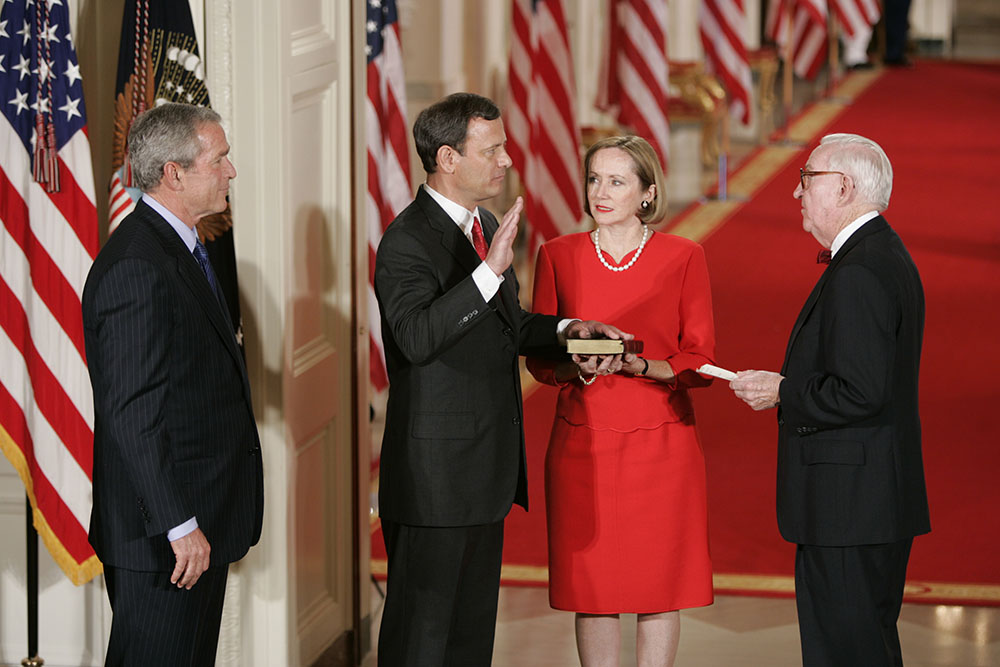
Roberts is sworn in as Chief Justice by Justice John Paul Stevens in the East Room of the White House as President Bush and Roberts's wife Jane look on, September 29, 2005.

Roberts took the constitutional oath of office, administered by Associate Justice John Paul Stevens at the White House, on September 29, 2005. On October 3, he took the judicial oath provided for by the Judiciary Act of 1789 at the United States Supreme Court building.

Justice Antonin Scalia said that Roberts "pretty much run[s] the show the same way" as Rehnquist, albeit "let[ting] people go on a little longer at conference ... but [he'll] get over that." Analysts such as Jeffrey Toobin have portrayed Roberts as a consistent advocate for conservative principles. Garrett Epps called Roberts's prose "crystalline, vivid, and often humorous."

Seventh Circuit judge Diane Sykes, surveying Roberts's first term on the Court, concluded that his jurisprudence "appears to be strongly rooted in the discipline of traditional legal method, evincing a fidelity to text, structure, history, and the constitutional hierarchy. He exhibits the restraint that flows from the careful application of established decisional rules and the practice of reasoning from the case law. He appears to place great stock in the process-oriented tools and doctrinal rules that guard against the aggregation of judicial power and keep judicial discretion in check: jurisdictional limits, structural federalism, textualism, and the procedural rules that govern the scope of judicial review." Roberts has been said to operate under an approach of judicial minimalism in his decisions, having said, "[i]f it is not necessary to decide more to a case, then in my view it is necessary not to decide more to a case." His decision-making and leadership seems to demonstrate an intention to preserve the Court's power and legitimacy while maintaining judicial independence.

In November 2018, the Associated Press approached Roberts for comment after President Donald Trump called a jurist who ruled against his asylum policy an "Obama judge." Roberts responded: "We do not have Obama judges or Trump judges, Bush judges or Clinton judges. What we have is an extraordinary group of dedicated judges doing their level best to do equal right to those appearing before them." His remarks were widely interpreted as a rebuke of Trump's comment. As Chief Justice, Roberts presided over the first impeachment trial of Donald Trump, which began on January 16 and ended on February 5, 2020. Roberts did not preside over Trump's second impeachment trial, believing that the Constitution requires only that the chief justice preside in the trial of a sitting president, not of a former president.

Although Roberts's judicial philosophy is considered conservative, he is seen as more moderate than his predecessor, William Rehnquist, particularly when Rehnquist's vote in Bush v. Gore is compared to Roberts's vote in National Federation of Independent Business v. Sebelius: his decision to uphold the Patient Protection and Affordable Care Act (ACA) caused the press to contrast his Court with the Rehnquist Court. Roberts's judicial philosophy is also seen as more moderate and conciliatory than those of Antonin Scalia or Clarence Thomas. He seems to want more consensus from the Court. At the beginning of his tenure, Roberts's voting pattern closely aligned with that of Samuel Alito, but in recent years, his voting pattern has resembled that of Brett Kavanaugh, who is generally seen as more moderate than Alito.

After the confirmation of Amy Coney Barrett, several commentators wrote that Roberts was no longer the leading justice. As the five other conservative justices could outvote the rest, he supposedly could no longer preside over a moderately conservative course while respecting precedent. This view was espoused again after the 2022 Dobbs decision, which overturned Roe v. Wade and Planned Parenthood v. Casey.

=== Presidential power ===
On June 26, 2018, Roberts wrote the majority opinion in Trump v. Hawaii, upholding the Trump administration's travel ban against seven nations, five of which had a Muslim majority. In his opinion, Roberts concluded that 8 U. S. C. §1182(f) of the Immigration and Nationality Act gives the president broad authority to suspend the entry of non-citizens into the country and that Presidential Proclamation 9645 did not exceed the limitations of said act. Additionally, Roberts wrote that the proclamation and its travel ban did not violate the Free Exercise Clause, as Trump's statements in support of the ban could be justified on the basis of national security.

On July 9, 2020, Roberts wrote the majority opinion in Trump v. Vance, regarding presidential immunity from criminal subpoenas relating to the president's personal information. In doing so, he rejected arguments relating to the investiture of absolute immunity in either the Supremacy Clause or Article II of the Constitution or of presidential entitlement to a higher standard of issuance of a subpoena. Roberts emphasized this point, writing, "In our judicial system, 'the public has a right to every man's evidence'. Since the earliest days of the Republic, 'every man' has included the President of the United States."

On July 9, 2020, Roberts wrote the majority opinion in Trump v. Mazars USA, LLP, regarding the authority of congressional subpoenas relating to certain personal information relating to the president. In his opinion, Roberts recognized the role of executive privilege in presidential decision-making but contended that executive privilege did not preclude blanket immunity from records requests, as protection caused by executive privilege "should not be transplanted root and branch to cases involving nonprivileged, private information, which by definition does not implicate sensitive Executive Branch deliberations."

On July 1, 2024, Roberts wrote the majority opinion in Trump v. United States, writing that a president has absolute immunity for acts committed as president within their constitutional purview, presumptive immunity for official acts, and no immunity for unofficial acts. In his opinion, Roberts notes the importance of balancing fair and effective enforcement of criminal laws, alongside the effects criminal charges for a president's official acts may have in hampering a president's decision-making while in office. Presumptive immunity for such official acts is therefore necessary "to ensure that the President can undertake his constitutionally designated functions effectively, free from undue pressure or distortions", but such a presumption can be overcome provided an assertion of criminality that "pose[s] no dangers of intrusion on the authority and functions of the Executive Branch." In determining whether a potentially criminal action is official, neither a violation of law nor a president's motives in acting on said violation may be used in determining it as such. In addition, in charging a president for crimes relating to unofficial acts, evidence involving official acts may not be used, as such usage would threaten "to eviscerate the immunity [...] recognized. It would permit a prosecutor to do indirectly what he cannot do directly—invite the jury to examine acts for which a President is immune from prosecution to nonetheless prove his liability on any charge."

=== Campaign finance ===
Roberts wrote the opinion in the 2007 decision FEC v. Wisconsin Right to Life, Inc., which held that provisions of the Bipartisan Campaign Reform Act of 2002 that limited political advertising were unconstitutional as applied to WRTL's issue ads preceding the election. Roberts and Justice Alito declined to revisit the Court's 2003 decision in McConnell v. FEC at that time.

In 2010, Roberts joined the opinion of the Court in Citizens United v. FEC, which struck down provisions of BCRA that restricted unions, corporations, and profitable organizations from independent political spending and prohibited the broadcasting of political media funded by them within 60 days of general elections or 30 days of primary elections. Roberts wrote his own concurring opinion "to address the important principles of judicial restraint and stare decisis implicated in this case".

Roberts wrote the plurality opinion in the 2014 landmark campaign finance case McCutcheon v. FEC, which held that "aggregate limits" on the combined amount a donor may give to various federal candidates or party committees violate the First Amendment.

In 2015, Roberts joined the liberal justices in Williams-Yulee v. Florida Bar, holding that the First Amendment does not prohibit states from barring judges and judicial candidates from personally soliciting funds for their election campaigns. For the majority, Roberts wrote that such a rule is narrowly tailored to serve the compelling interest of keeping the judiciary impartial.

In 2021, the Supreme Court decided Americans for Prosperity Foundation v. Bonta, which held that California's requirement that nonprofit organizations disclose the identity of their donors to the state's Attorney General as a precondition of soliciting donations in the state violates the First Amendment. For the majority, Roberts wrote, "California casts a dragnet for sensitive donor information from tens of thousands of charities each year, even though that information will become relevant in only a small number of cases involving filed complaints." It therefore does not serve a narrowly tailored government interest and thus is invalid.

=== Fourth Amendment ===
Roberts wrote his first dissent in Georgia v. Randolph (2006). The majority's decision prohibited police from searching a home if both occupants are present, one objects, and the other consents. Roberts criticized the decision as inconsistent with prior case law and for partly basing its reasoning on its perception of social custom. He said the social expectation test was flawed because the Fourth Amendment protects a legitimate expectation of privacy, not social expectations.

In Utah v. Strieff (2016), Roberts joined the five-justice majority in ruling that a person with an outstanding warrant may be arrested and searched and that any evidence discovered in that search is admissible in court; the majority held that this remains true even when police act unlawfully by stopping a person without reasonable suspicion, before learning of the existence of the outstanding warrant.

In Carpenter v. United States (2018), a landmark decision involving privacy of cellular phone data, Roberts wrote the majority opinion in a 5–4 ruling that searches of cellular phone data generally require a warrant.

=== Abortion ===
In Gonzales v. Carhart (2007), Roberts voted with the majority to uphold the Partial-Birth Abortion Ban Act. Kennedy, writing for a five-justice majority, distinguished Stenberg v. Carhart, and concluded that the Court's previous decision in Planned Parenthood v. Casey did not prevent Congress from banning the procedure. The decision left the door open for future as-applied challenges, and did not address the broader question of whether Congress had the authority to pass the law. Thomas filed a concurring opinion contending that Roe v. Wade and Casey should be reversed; Roberts did not join that opinion.

In 2018, Roberts and Kavanaugh joined four more liberal justices in declining to hear a case brought by Louisiana and Kansas to deny Medicaid funding to Planned Parenthood, thereby letting stand lower court rulings in Planned Parenthood's favor. Roberts also joined with liberal justices in 5–4 decisions temporarily blocking a Louisiana abortion restriction (2019) and later striking down that law (June Medical Services, LLC v. Russo (2020). The law at issue in June was similar to one the court struck down in Whole Woman's Health v. Hellerstedt (2016), which Roberts had voted to uphold; in his June opinion, Roberts wrote that while he believed Whole Woman's Health was wrongly decided he was joining the majority in June out of respect for stare decisis. It was the first time in his 15 years on the Supreme Court that Roberts had cast a vote to invalidate a law that regulated abortion. In September 2021, the Supreme Court declined an emergency petition to temporarily block enforcement of the Texas Heartbeat Act, which bans abortion after six weeks of pregnancy except to save the mother's life. Roberts, Breyer, Sotomayor, and Kagan were in the minority. In 2022, Roberts declined to join the majority opinion in Dobbs v. Jackson Women's Health Organization, which overturned Roe v. Wade. He wrote a concurring opinion supporting only the decision to uphold the Mississippi abortion statute, stating that the right to an abortion should "extend far enough to ensure a reasonable opportunity to choose, but need not extend any further." Roberts also declined to join the dissenting opinion by Breyer, Sotomayor, and Kagan.

=== Capital punishment ===
On November 4, 2016, Roberts was the deciding vote in a 5–3 decision to stay an execution. On February 7, 2019, he was part of the majority in a 5–4 decision rejecting a Muslim inmate's request to delay execution in order to have an imam present with him during the execution. Also in February 2019, Roberts sided with Kavanaugh and the court's four liberal justices in a 6–3 decision to block the execution of a man with an "intellectual disability" in Texas.

=== Affirmative action ===
Roberts opposes the use of race in assigning students to particular schools, including for the purpose of maintaining integrated schools. He sees such plans as discrimination in violation of the Constitution's Equal Protection Clause and Brown v. Board of Education. In Parents Involved in Community Schools v. Seattle School District No. 1, the Court considered two voluntarily adopted school district plans that relied on race to determine which schools certain children may attend. The Court had held in Brown that "racial discrimination in public education is unconstitutional," and later, that "racial classifications, imposed by whatever federal, state, or local governmental actor, ... are constitutional only if they are narrowly tailored measures that further compelling governmental interests," and that this "[n]arrow tailoring ... require[s] serious, good faith consideration of workable race-neutral alternatives." Roberts cited these cases in writing for the Parents Involved majority, concluding that the school districts had "failed to show that they considered methods other than explicit racial classifications to achieve their stated goals." In a section of the opinion joined by four other justices, Roberts added that "[t]he way to stop discrimination on the basis of race is to stop discriminating on the basis of race."

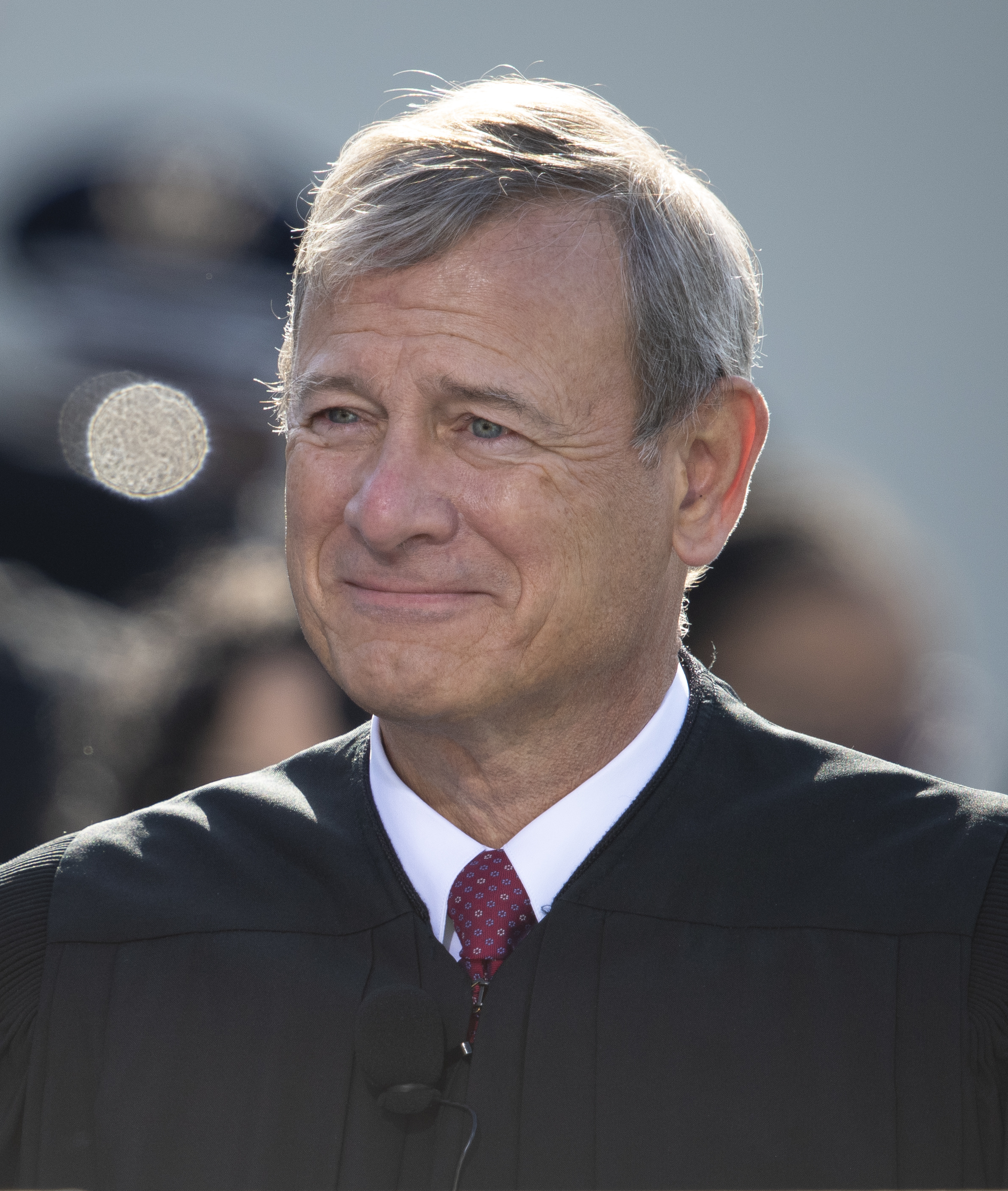
Roberts in 2021

On June 29, 2023, Roberts wrote the majority opinion in Students for Fair Admissions v. Harvard, which held that race-based affirmative action in both public and private universities violates the Equal Protection Clause.

=== Free speech ===
Roberts wrote the majority opinion in the 2007 student free speech case Morse v. Frederick, ruling that a student in a public school-sponsored activity does not have the right to advocate drug use on the basis that the right to free speech does not invariably prevent the exercise of school discipline.

On April 20, 2010, in United States v. Stevens, the Court struck down an animal cruelty law. Writing for an 8–1 majority, Roberts found that a federal statute criminalizing the commercial production, sale, or possession of depictions of cruelty to animals was an unconstitutional abridgment of the First Amendment right to freedom of speech. The Court held that the statute was substantially overbroad; for example, it could allow prosecutions for selling photos of out-of-season hunting.

On March 2, 2011, Roberts wrote the majority opinion in Snyder v. Phelps, holding that speech as a matter of public concern, even if considered offensive or outrageous, cannot be the basis of liability for a tort of emotional stress. In doing so, he wrote that comments Phelps made constituted "matters of public import" as they related to societal issues and that Snyder was not determined to be a "captive audience" as determined by the captive audience doctrine. In his conclusion, Roberts wrote, "On the facts before us, we cannot react to that pain by punishing the speaker. As a nation, we have chosen a different course—to protect even hurtful speech on public issues to ensure that we do not stifle public debate."

=== Health care reform ===
On June 28, 2012, Roberts wrote the majority opinion in National Federation of Independent Business v. Sebelius, which upheld a key component of the Patient Protection and Affordable Care Act by a 5–4 vote. The Court found that although the Act's "individual mandate" component could not be upheld under the Commerce Clause, the mandate could be construed as a tax and was therefore valid under Congress's authority to "lay and collect taxes." At the same time, the Court overturned a portion of the law related to the expansion of Medicaid; Roberts wrote that "Congress is not free ... to penalize states that choose not to participate in that new program by taking away their existing Medicaid funding." Sources within the Supreme Court said that Roberts switched his vote regarding the individual mandate sometime after an initial vote and that he largely wrote both the majority and minority opinions. This extremely unusual circumstance has also been used to explain why the minority opinion was unsigned, itself a rare phenomenon at the Supreme Court.

=== LGBT rights ===
In Hollingsworth v. Perry (2013), Roberts wrote the 5–4 majority opinion holding that petitioners, appealing a lower court ruling that California's Proposition 8 was unconstitutional, lacked standing to sue, with the result that same-sex marriages resumed in California. Roberts dissented in United States v. Windsor, in which a 5–4 majority ruled that key parts of the Defense of Marriage Act were unconstitutional. The court found that the federal government must recognize same-sex marriages that certain states have approved. Roberts dissented in Obergefell v. Hodges, in which Kennedy wrote for the majority, again 5–4, that same-sex couples had a right to marry. In Pavan v. Smith, the Supreme Court "summarily overruled" the Arkansas Supreme Court's decision that the state does not have to list same-sex spouses on birth certificates; Thomas, Alito, and Gorsuch dissented, but Roberts joined the majority. In the cases of Bostock v. Clayton County, Altitude Express, Inc. v. Zarda, and R.G. & G.R. Harris Funeral Homes Inc. v. Equal Employment Opportunity Commission (2020), heard together, Roberts ruled with the 6–3 majority that businesses cannot discriminate against LGBT people in matters of employment. In October 2020, Roberts joined the justices in an "apparently unanimous" decision to reject an appeal from Kim Davis, who refused to provide marriage licenses to same-sex couples.

In Fulton v. City of Philadelphia (2021), Roberts joined a unanimous decision in favor of a Catholic adoption agency that the City of Philadelphia had denied a contract for its policy not to adopt to same-sex couples; he was also part of the majority that declined to reconsider or overturn Employment Division v. Smith, "an important precedent limiting First Amendment protections for religious practices." Also in 2021, he was one of the six justices who declined to hear an appeal by a Washington State florist who refused service to a same-sex couple based on her religious beliefs against same-sex marriage; because four votes are required to hear a case, the lower court judgments against the florist remain in place. In November 2021, Roberts voted with the majority in a 6–3 decision to reject an appeal from Mercy San Juan Medical Center, a hospital affiliated with the Roman Catholic Church, which had sought to deny a hysterectomy to a transgender patient on religious grounds. Thomas, Alito, and Gorsuch dissented; the vote to reject the appeal left in place a lower court ruling in the patient's favor.

=== Voting Rights Act ===
As chief justice, Roberts has been in the majority in decisions that struck down voting rights protections provided by the Voting Rights Act. In Shelby County v. Holder (2013), he voted with the majority to strike down requirements that states and localities with a history of racially motivated voter suppression obtain federal preclearance before making any changes to voting laws. Research shows that preclearance led to increases in minority congressional representation and minority turnout. Five years after the ruling, nearly 1,000 U.S. polling places had closed, many of them in predominantly African-American counties. There were also cuts to early voting, purges of voter rolls, and impositions of strict voter ID laws. A 2020 study found that jurisdictions that had previously been covered by preclearance substantially increased their voter registration purges after Shelby.

In 2023, Roberts and Kavanaugh joined the liberal justices in Allen v. Milligan, a 5–4 decision holding that Alabama's congressional redistricting plan violated Section 2 of the VRA. Writing for the majority, Roberts ruled that Alabama must draw an additional majority-minority district. Writing for himself and the three liberal justices, Roberts also wrote that "[t]he contention that mapmakers must be entirely 'blind' to race has no footing in our §2 case law."

== Awards and honors ==
In 2007, Roberts received an honorary degree from the College of the Holy Cross. He also delivered a commencement address at Holy Cross that year. In 2023, Roberts was awarded the Henry J. Friendly Medal of the American Law Institute.

== Personal life ==
Roberts and his wife, Jane Sullivan, were married on July 27, 1996, in the Cathedral of St. Matthew the Apostle. J. Michael Luttig was a groomsman at their wedding. Sullivan is a lawyer who met Roberts in New York. After graduating from the College of the Holy Cross, she received a master's degree in mathematics from Brown University and a Juris Doctor degree from the Georgetown University Law Center. She became a prominent legal recruiter at the firms of Major, Lindsey & Africa and Mlegal. Like Clarence Thomas, Sullivan has been on Holy Cross's board of trustees. They have two adopted children.

During the late 1990s, while working for Hogan & Hartson, Roberts served on the steering committee of the Washington, D.C., chapter of the conservative Federalist Society, although he has said he has little recollection of any involvement.

In 2022, it was reported that Jane Roberts earned $20 million from law firms with business before the Supreme Court.

=== Health ===
In 2007, Roberts had a seizure at his vacation home in St. George, Maine, and stayed overnight at a hospital in Rockport, Maine; doctors found no identifiable cause. Roberts had suffered a similar seizure in 1993 but an official Supreme Court statement said that a neurological evaluation "revealed no cause for concern." Federal judges are not required by law to release information about their health.

On June 21, 2020, Roberts fell at a Maryland country club; his forehead required sutures and he stayed overnight in the hospital for observation. Doctors ruled out a seizure and believed dehydration had made Roberts light-headed.

== Selected works ==
- Roberts, John (1978). "Developments in the Law: Zoning – III. The Takings Clause". Harvard Law Review. 91: 1462–1501. doi:10.2307/1340392. JSTOR 1340392. Section III ("The Takings Clause") of the unsigned student note "Developments in the Law: Zoning" (pp. 1427–1708).
- Roberts, John (1978). "The Supreme Court, 1977 Term – Contract Clause—Legislative Alteration of Private Pension Agreements: Allied Structural Steel Co. v. Spannaus". Harvard Law Review. 92: 86–98. doi:10.2307/1340566. JSTOR 1340566. Subsection C ("Contract Clause—Legislative Alteration of Private Pension Agreements: Allied Structural Steel Co. v. Spannaus") of Section I ("Constitutional Law") of the unsigned student note "The Supreme Court, 1977 Term" (pp. 1–339).
- Roberts, John; Prettyman, Elijah Barrett Jr. (February 26, 1990). "New Rules and Old Pose Stumbling Blocks in High Court Cases". Legal Times.
- Roberts, John; Starr, Kenneth; Mueller III., Robert Swan; Lazerwitz, Michael (1991). "At Issue: The Noriega Tapes. Yes: The Order was Constitutional". ABA Journal. 77 (2): 36. JSTOR 20761397.
- Roberts, John (1993). "Article III Limits on Statutory Standing". Duke Law Journal. 42 (6): 1219–1232. doi:10.2307/1372783. JSTOR 1372783.
- Roberts, John (March 28, 1993). "Riding the Coattails of the Solicitor General". Legal Times.
- Roberts, John (May 5, 1993). "Rule of Law: The New Solicitor General And the Power of the Amicus". The Wall Street Journal.
- Roberts, John (1994). "The 1992–1993 Supreme Court". Public Interest Law Review. 1994: 107.
- Roberts, John (1995). "Forfeitures: Does Innocence Matter". New Jersey Law Journal. 142: 28.
- Roberts, John (1997). "Thoughts on Presenting an Effective Oral Argument" (PDF). School Law in Review. 1997: 7-1 – 7-6. Archived from the original (PDF) on September 10, 2005.
- Roberts, John; Starr, Kenneth; Mahoney, Maureen (2003). "Rex E. Lee Conference on the Office of the Solicitor General of the United States: Bush Panel". Brigham Young University Law Review. 2003 (1): 62–82.
- Roberts, John (2005). "Oral Advocacy and the Re-emergence of a Supreme Court Bar". Journal of Supreme Court History. 30 (1): 68–81. doi:10.1111/j.1059-4329.2005.00098.x. S2CID 145369518.
- Roberts, John (2005). "A Tribute to Chief Justice Rehnquist" (PDF). Harvard Law Review. 119: 1–2. JSTOR 4093552. Archived from the original (PDF) on March 4, 2009.
- Roberts, John (2006). "Tribute to Judge Edward R. Becker". University of Pennsylvania Law Review. 155 (1): 3–4. JSTOR 40041300. Archived from the original on October 8, 2014.
- Roberts, John (2006). "What Makes the D.C. Circuit Different? A Historical View" (PDF). Virginia Law Review. 92 (3): 375–389. JSTOR 4144947. Archived from the original (PDF) on January 14, 2017.
- Roberts, John (2016). "In Memoriam: Justice Antonin Scalia" (PDF). Harvard Law Review. 130 (1): 1–2. JSTOR 44072402.
- Roberts, John (2018). "In Tribute: Justice Anthony M. Kennedy" (PDF). Harvard Law Review. 132 (1): 1–3.
- Roberts, John (2020). "Memoriam: Justice John Paul Stevens" (PDF). Harvard Law Review. 133 (3): 747–748.

== See also ==
- Demographics of the Supreme Court of the United States
- List of justices of the Supreme Court of the United States
- List of law clerks for the chief justice of the United States
- List of law clerks for the ninth seat of the Supreme Court of the United States
- List of United States chief justices by time in office
- List of United States Supreme Court justices by time in office
- United States Supreme Court cases decided by the Roberts Court

== Additional sources ==
External videos
- Presentation by Biskupic on The Chief, March 28, 2019, C-SPAN
- Q&A interview with Biskupic on The Chief, March 31, 2019, C-SPAN

- Neubauer, David W.; Meinhold, Stephen S. (2005). Battle Supreme: The Confirmation of Chief Justice John Roberts and the Future of the Supreme Court. Cengage. ISBN 978-0495171072.
- Toobin, Jeffrey (2007). The Nine: Inside the Secret World of the Supreme Court. Random House. ISBN 978-0-385-51640-2.
- Greenburg, Jan Crawford (2007). Supreme Conflict: The Inside Story of the Struggle for Control of the United States Supreme Court. Penguin Group. ISBN 978-1-59420-101-1.
- Snyder, Brad (December 8, 2010). "The Judicial Genealogy (and Mythology) of John Roberts: Clerkships from Gray to Brandeis to Friendly to Roberts". Ohio State Law Journal. 71 (1149). SSRN 1722362.
- Tushnet, Mark (September 30, 2013). In the Balance: Law and Politics on the Roberts Court. W. W. Norton. ISBN 978-0393073447.
- Friedman, Leon (2013). "John G. Roberts, Jr.". In Friedman, Leon; Israel, Fred L. (eds.). The Justices of the United States Supreme Court: Their Lives and Major Opinions (4th ed.). New York, NY: Facts On File, Inc. ISBN 978-0791013779.
- Brennan-Marquez, Kiel (2014). "The Philosophy and Jurisprudence of Chief Justice Roberts". Utah Law Review. 2014 (1). Contribution by Linda Greenhouse: 138–186. doi:10.63140/zq8bhk2kg1.
- Whittington, Keith (May 2014). "The Least Activist Supreme Court in History? The Roberts Court and the Exercise of Judicial Review". Notre Dame Law Review. 89 (5): 2219–2252.
- Adler, Jonathan H. (2016). Business and the Roberts Court. Oxford University Press. ISBN 978-0-19-062092-9.
- Biskupic, Joan (2019). The Chief: The Life and Turbulent Times of Chief Justice John Roberts. New York: Basic Books. ISBN 9780465093274.
- Stone, Geoffrey R. (January 2020). "A Four-Decade Perspective on Life Inside the Supreme Court" (PDF). Harvard Law Review. 133 (3): 1010–1046.

Legal offices
Preceded by James L. Buckley	Judge of the United States Court of Appeals for the District of Columbia Circuit; 2003–2005	Succeeded by Patricia Millett
Preceded by William Rehnquist	Chief Justice of the United States; 2005–present	Incumbent
U.S. order of precedence (ceremonial)
Preceded by Mike Johnson as Speaker of the U.S. House of Representatives	Order of precedence of the United States as Chief Justice of the United States	Succeeded by Bill Clinton as Former president of the United States
