= Ted Ullyot =

American lawyer

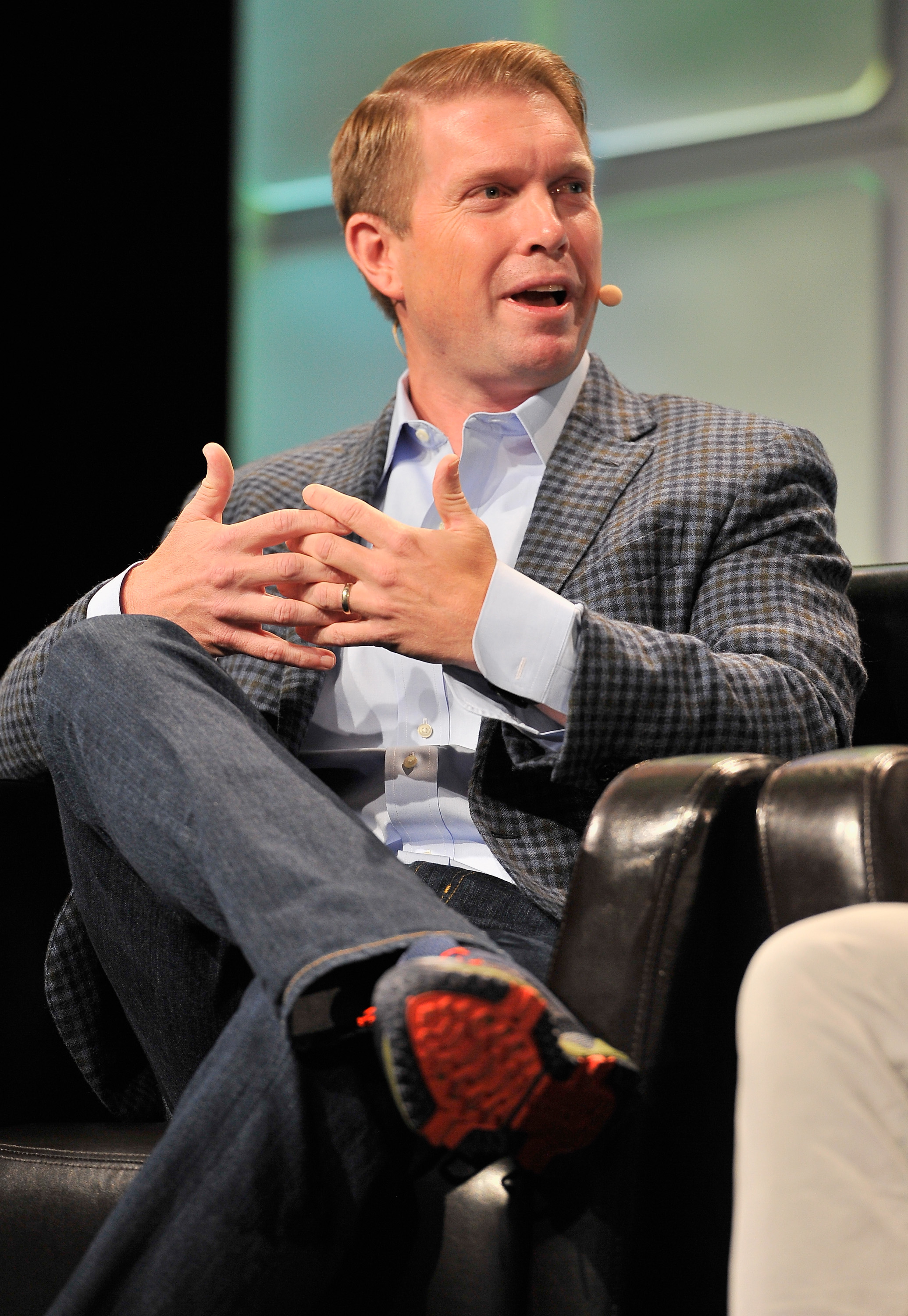
- Ullyot (2016)
- Education: Harvard College and University of Chicago Law School
- Occupations: VP and General Counsel, Facebook
- Spouse: Jennifer A. Lahey (m. 1995)

Theodore W. Ullyot is an American lawyer and former government official. He is a partner at the venture capital firm Andreessen Horowitz, leading the firm's policy and regulatory affairs group.

Ullyot served as Facebook's General Counsel from September 2008 until July 2013.

== Education ==
Ullyot graduated magna cum laude from Harvard College in 1990. He studied at the Institut d'Etudes Politiques in Paris from 1990 through 1991. Ullyot attended the University of Chicago Law School, receiving a J.D. with honors in 1994. After graduation, he clerked for U.S. Supreme Court Justice Antonin Scalia and Fourth Circuit Court of Appeals Judge J. Michael Luttig.

== Career ==
=== Early legal career ===
Ullyot was a partner at the law firm Kirkland & Ellis in Washington, D.C., specializing in telecommunications and appellate law. In October 2000, Ullyot joined the legal department of America Online. After the merger of AOL and Time Warner, he worked for AOL Time Warner from January 2001 to January 2003. After starting in New York City as vice president and associate general counsel of AOL Time Warner, he was appointed senior vice president and general counsel for AOL Time Warner Europe in January 2002.

=== Bush administration ===
From January 2003 to January 2005, Ullyot worked in the White House as associate counsel and as a deputy assistant to President George W. Bush. He then served as chief of staff to U.S. Attorney General Alberto R. Gonzales, and was involved with the approval of the Torture Memos. In October 2005, he left the administration to join ESL Investments, Inc. as executive vice president and general counsel.

=== Facebook ===
Ullyot then returned to Kirkland & Ellis until being recruited to join Facebook in the fall of 2008. In September 2008, Ullyot was hired as Facebook's general counsel. At the time, the site had more than 100 million members and was valued at $15 billion. Ullyot was tasked with addressing the complicated privacy issues that Facebook faces due to its wealth of user data. In the ensuing years, Ullyot advised Facebook through litigation involving the Winklevoss twins, a patent battle with Yahoo! Inc., and the controversy surrounding its May 2012 initial public offering. In May 2013, Ullyot left his post after five years with Facebook. Colin Stretch, who had served as Deputy General Counsel under Ullyot, replaced him. Ullyot also served on the board of directors for AutoZone, Inc. from 2006 to 2011.

=== Post-Facebook career ===
In April 2015, Ullyot joined the venture firm Andreessen Horowitz to build out the firm's network of policy experts. In 2022, it was reported that Ullyot and former Attorney General William Barr would launch a law and consulting firm.

== See also ==
- List of law clerks for the ninth seat of the Supreme Court of the United States
