= Guynn =

Guynn is a surname. Notable people with the surname include:

- Jack Guynn (born 1943), American economist
- Randall D. Guynn (born 1957), American lawyer

== See also ==
- Gunn (surname)
