= Maeva Marcus =

American historian

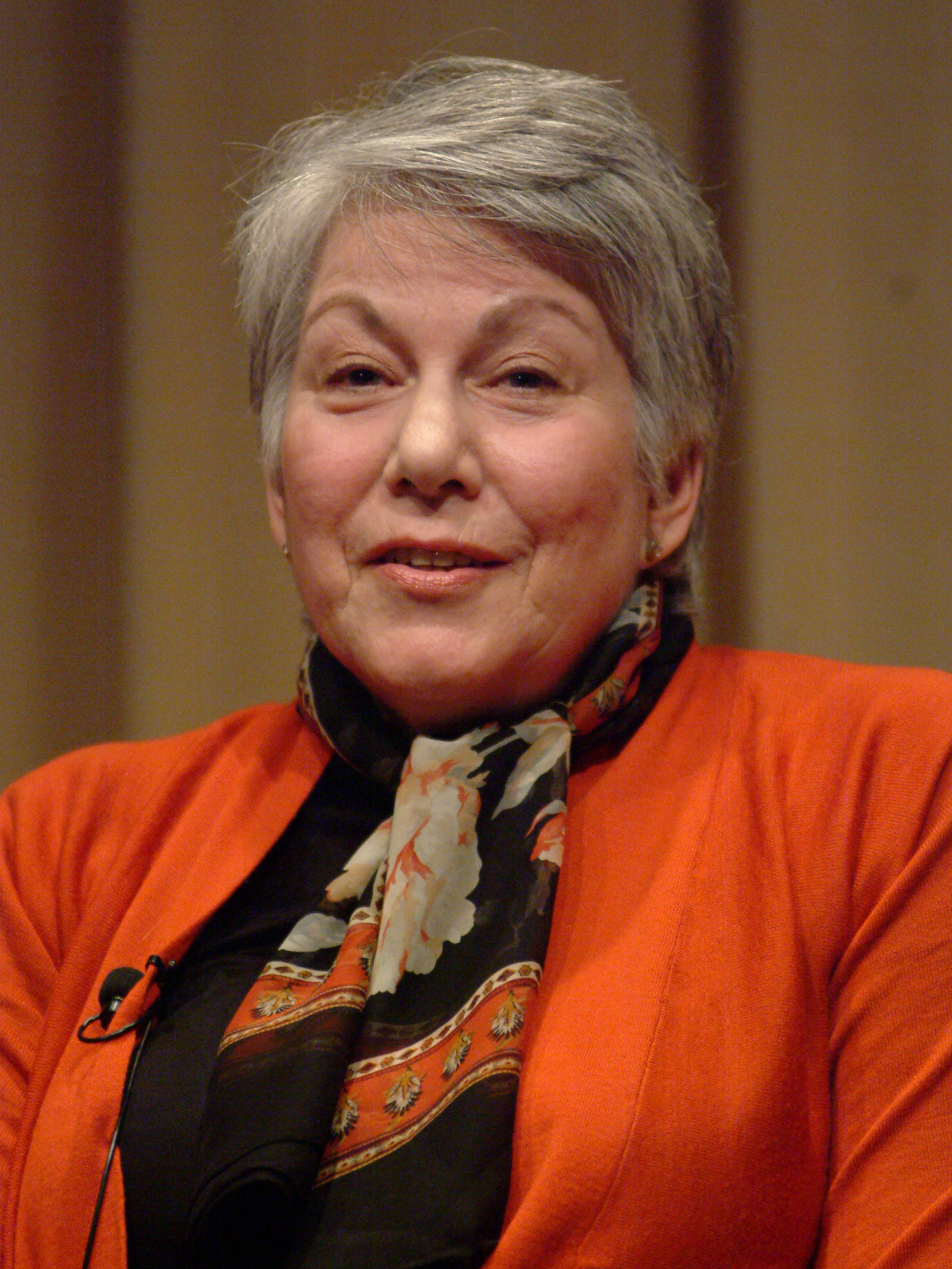
Marcus in 2009

Maeva Marcus is the director of the Institute for Constitutional Studies and a research professor of law at George Washington University Law School. She received her Ph.D. in history from Columbia University in 1975. Her dissertation, Truman and the Steel Seizure Case: the Limits of Presidential Power, published by the Columbia University Press and reissued by Duke University Press, was nominated for the Bancroft Prize, the Pulitzer Prize, and several other prestigious awards.

Marcus is a research professor of law at George Washington University, a position she has held since 2006. She previously served as an instructor at the University of Connecticut, Waterbury branch, and also was a visiting professor of law at Georgetown University Law Center, where she taught a variety of legal and constitutional history courses to faculty and students.

In 2015, the Library of Congress and the permanent committee of the Oliver Wendell Holmes Devise announced the appointment of Marcus as the general editor of the "Oliver Wendell Holmes Devise History of the Supreme Court of the United States.

She currently directs the Institute for Constitutional Studies at the George Washington University Law School. Established in 2000, this institute is a national forum for scholarship in constitutional history and is dedicated to helping people understand the historical significance of the U.S. Constitution for years to come.

Marcus is actively involved in several professional organizations. She completed a two-year term as president of the American Society for Legal History in November 2009, where she remains an active member, and currently serves as a member of the Society for History in the Federal Government. She also previously served on the board of directors of The Constitutional Sources Project, and served as a member of the permanent committee for the Oliver Wendell Holmes Devise from 2001 to 2009.

She is also the author and editor of an extensive list of legal publications, including eight volumes of The Documentary History of the Supreme Court, 1789-1800 and a series published with Cambridge University Press titled "Cambridge Studies on the American Constitution."

== Publications ==
=== Books ===
- Truman and the Steel Seizure Case: the Limits of Presidential Power (Columbia University Press, 1977; paperback, 1979; reprinted by Duke University Press, 1994).
- The Documentary History of the Supreme Court of the United States, 1789-1800, Volume 1 (in two parts), co-edited by James R. Perry, Columbia University Press, 1985; Volume 2 (Maeva Marcus, editor), 1988; Volume 3 (Maeva Marcus, editor), 1990; Volume 4 (Maeva Marcus, editor), 1992; Volume 5 (Maeva Marcus, editor), 1994; Volume 6 (Maeva Marcus, editor), 1998; Volume 7 (Maeva Marcus, editor), 2003; Volume 8 (Maeva Marcus, editor), 2007 .
- Origins of the Federal Judiciary: Essays on the Judiciary Act of 1789, Maeva Marcus, editor and contributor, Oxford University Press, 1992.
- With Liberty and Justice for All? The Constitution in the Classroom, Edited by Steven A. Steinbach, Maeva Marcus, and Robert Cohen, "Oxford University Press", 2022. https://global.oup.com/ushe/product/with-liberty-and-justice-for-all-9780197516300?cc=us&lang=en&

=== Journal articles ===
- “Falling Under the Brandeis Spell,” Review essay, Yale Law Journal, (November, 1985).
- “Marbury v. Madison: John Marshall’s Selective Use of History,” with Susan Low Bloch, University of Wisconsin Law Review (Number 2; 1986). Reprinted in Supreme Court Historical Society, Yearbook, 1987.
- “Hayburn's Case: A Misinterpretation of Precedent,” with Robert Teir, University of Wisconsin Law Review (Number 4; 1988).
- “Separation of Powers in the Early National Period,” William and Mary Law Review (Volume 30, 1989).
- “The Adoption of the Bill of Rights,” William & Mary Bill of Rights Journal (Volume 1, Spring 1992).
- “Suits Against States,” with Natalie Wexler, Journal of Supreme Court History, 1993.
- “Georgia v. Brailsford,” Journal of Supreme Court History, 1996.
- “George Washington’s Appointments to the Supreme Court.” Journal of Supreme Court History, 1999.
- “Is the Supreme Court a Political Institution?” The George Washington Law Review, Vol.72, number 1/2, December 2003.
- “Will Youngstown Survive?” Duquesne Law Review, Vol. 41, number 4, summer 2003.
- “Federal Judicial Selection: The First Decade,” University of Richmond Law Review, Vol. 39, number 3, March 2005.
- “The Effect (or Non-Effect) of Founders on the Supreme Court Bench,” The George Washington Law Review, Vol. 80, November 2012.

=== Book chapters ===
- “Judges and Legislators in the New Federal System, 1789-1800,” with Emily Van Tassel, in Judges and Legislators: Toward Institutional Comity, Robert A. Katzmann, ed. (The Brookings Institution, 1988).
- “Judicial Power under the Constitution,” in Hogsta domsmakten i Sverige under 200 ar, Rolf Nygren, ed. (Stockholm: 1990).
- “Louis D. Brandeis and the Laboratories of Democracy,” in Federalism and the Judicial Mind, Harry Scheiber, ed., University of California, Berkeley (1992).
- “Judicial Review in the Early Republic,” in Launching the “Extended Republic”: The Federalist Era, Ronald Hoffman, ed., University Press of Virginia (1997).
- “The Founding Fathers, Marbury vs Madison -- And So What? in Constitutional Justice under Old Constitutions, Eivind Smith, ed., Kluwer Law International, 1995.
- “Federalism to the Civil War,” in The New Federalism: Structures and Infrastructures, American and European Perspectives, Kjell Ake Modéer, ed. (Sweden: FRN, 2000).
- “Presidential Power in Times of Crisis: Youngstown Sheet & Tube v. Sawyer (1952),” in Creating Constitutional Change: Clashes over Power and Liberty in the Supreme Court, Gregg Ivers and Kevin T. McGuire, eds. (University of Virginia Press, 2004).
- "The Earliest Years (1790-1801): Laying Foundations," in Christopher L. Tomlins, ed., The United States Supreme Court: The Pursuit of Justice (Houghton Mifflin, 2005).
- “John Marshall Was Not the First Chief Justice,” Proceedings of the American Philosophical Society, Vol. 153, No. 1, March 2009.
- Blackstone in America: Selected Essays of Kathryn Preyer, Mary Sarah Bilder, Maeva Marcus, R. Kent Newmyer, eds. (Cambridge University Press, 2009).
