= List of law clerks for the ninth seat of the Supreme Court of the United States =

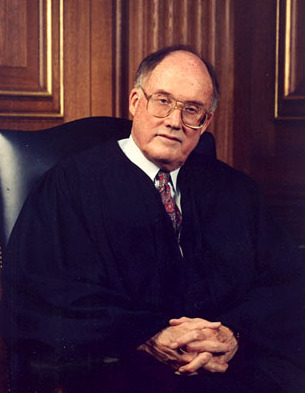
William Rehnquist, 16th Chief Justice of the United States, clerked for Justice Robert Jackson during the 1952 term.

Law clerks have assisted the justices of the United States Supreme Court in various capacities since the first one was hired by Justice Horace Gray in 1882. Each justice is permitted to have three or four law clerks per Court term. Most persons serving in this capacity are recent law school graduates (and typically graduated at the top of their class). Among their many functions, clerks do legal research that assists justices in deciding what cases to accept and what questions to ask during oral arguments, prepare memoranda, and draft orders and opinions. After retiring from the Court, a justice may continue to employ a law clerk, who may be assigned to provide additional assistance to an active justice or may assist the retired justice when sitting by designation with a lower court.

== Table of law clerks ==
The following is a table of law clerks serving the associate justice holding the ninth seat of the Supreme Court (the Court's ninth associate justice seat by order of creation), which was established on March 3, 1863 by the 37th Congress through the Tenth Circuit Act of 1863 (12 Stat. 794). This seat is currently occupied by Justice Neil Gorsuch.

Seat 9 associate justices and law clerks

Stephen Johnson Field

May 20, 1863 –
December 1, 1897

Clerk	Started	Finished	School (year)	Previous clerkship
Irwin B. Linton	1889	1895	GW-Columbian (1876)	
Clarence M. York	1896	1897		M. W. Fuller

Joseph McKenna

January 26, 1898 –
January 5, 1925

Clerk	Started	Finished	School (year)	Previous clerkship
James Cecil Hooe	1898	1911		
Ashton F. Embry	1911	December 16, 1919	Georgetown (1905)	
Robert F. Cogswell	1919	1924	Georgetown (1913)	

Harlan F. Stone

March 2, 1925 –
July 2, 1941^{CJ}

Clerk	Started	Finished	School (year)	Previous clerkship
Robert F. Cogswell	1925	1925	Georgetown (1913)	J. McKenna
Alfred McCormack	1925	1926	Columbia (1925)	
Milton C. Handler	1926	1927	Columbia (1926)	
Francis X. Downey	1927	1928	Columbia (1927)	
Oliver Boutwell Merrill, Jr.	1928	1929	Columbia (1928)	
Adrian Coulter Leiby	1929	1930	Columbia (1929)	
Wilbur H. Friedman	1930	1931	Columbia (1930)	
Walter F. Gellhorn	1931	1932	Columbia (1931)	
Herbert Wechsler	1932	1933	Columbia (1931)	
Howard C. Westwood	1933	1934	Columbia (1933)	
Warner W. Gardner	1934	1935	Columbia (1934)	
Thomas Everett Harris	1935	1936	Columbia (1935)	
Harold Leventhal	1937	1938	Columbia (1936)	none
Louis Lusky	1937	1938	Columbia (1937)	
Alexis C. Coudert	1938	1939	Columbia (1938)	
Allison Dunham	1939	1941	Columbia (1939)	

Robert H. Jackson

July 11, 1941 –
October 9, 1954

Clerk	Started	Finished	School (year)	Previous clerkship
John F. Costelloe	1941	1943	Harvard (1940)	
Phil C. Neal	1943	1945	Harvard (1943)	none
Murray Gartner	1945	1947	Harvard (1945)	none
James M. Marsh	1947	1949	Temple (1947)	
Howard C. Buschman, Jr.	1949	1950	Albany (1949)	none
Alan Y. Cole	1949	1950	Yale (1949)	
John F. Cushman	1950	1951	Cornell (1949)	Edgerton (D.C. Cir.)
C. George Niebank, Jr.	1950	1952	Buffalo (1950)	
William H. Rehnquist	1952	1953	Stanford (1952)	none
Donald B. Cronson	1952	1953	Chicago (1948)	
E. Barrett Prettyman, Jr.	1953	October 1954	Virginia (1953)	none

John Marshall Harlan II

March 28, 1955 –
September 23, 1971

Clerk	Started	Finished	School (year)	Previous clerkship
William T. Lifland	1955	1955	Harvard (1952)	J.M. Harlan (2d Cir.)
E. Barrett Prettyman, Jr.	1955	1955	Virginia (1953)	Frankfurter / R. H. Jackson
Wayne G. Barnett	1955	1956	Harvard (1953)	
Leonard M. Leiman	1955	1956	Harvard (1954)	L. Hand (2d Cir.)
Paul M. Bator	1956	1957	Harvard (1956)	none
Norbert A. Schlei	1956	1957	Yale (1956)	
Norman Dorsen	1957	1958	Harvard (1953)	Magruder (1st Cir.)
Henry J. Steiner	1957	1958	Harvard (1955)	
Henry P. Sailer	1958	1959	Harvard (1954)	
Stephen Shulman	1958	1959	Yale (1958)	
Jay A. Erens	1959	1960	Harvard (1959)	
Howard Lesnick	1959	1960	Columbia (1958)	none
Charles Fried	1960	1961	Columbia (1960)	none
Philip B. Heymann	1960	1961	Harvard (1960)	none
Nathan Lewin	1961	1962	Harvard (1960)	Lumbard (2d Cir.)
John B. Rhinelander	1961	1962	Virginia (1961)	
Richard J. Hiegel	1962	1963	Columbia (1962)	
David L. Shapiro	1962	1963	Harvard (1957)	none
R. Kent Greenawalt	1963	1964	Columbia (1963)	
Lloyd L. Weinreb	1963	1964	Harvard (1962)	Lumbard (2d Cir.)
Michael M. Maney	1964	1965	Penn (1964)	
Charles R. Nesson	1964	1965	Harvard (1965)	none
Michael Boudin	1965	1966	Harvard (1964)	Friendly (2d Cir.)
Matthew Nimetz	1965	1967	Harvard (1965)	
Charles Lister	1966	1968	GW (1966)	
Bert W. Rein	1966	1967	Harvard (1964)	
Louis R. Cohen	1967	1968	Harvard (1966)	
Thomas B. Stoel, Jr.	1967	1969	Harvard (1966)	
Bruce A. Ackerman	1968	1969	Yale (1967)	Friendly (2d Cir.)
Paul Brest	1968	1969	Harvard (1965)	Aldrich (1st Cir.)
Charles L. Fabrikant	1969	1970	Columbia (1968)	Leventhal (D.C. Cir.)
William T. Lake	1969	1970	Stanford (1968)	Friendly (2d Cir.)
Robert Harris Mnookin	1969	1970	Harvard (1968)	McGowan (D.C. Cir.)
Marvin L. ("Monty") Gray, Jr.	1970	1971	Harvard (1969)	Friendly (2d Cir.)
Thomas G. Krattenmaker	1970	1971	Columbia (1968)	
Martin D. Minsker	1970	September 23, 1971	Harvard (JD, 1969; LLM, 1970)	none
James R. Bieke	1971	September 23, 1971	Michigan (1970)	Lumbard (2d Cir.)
Allen R. Snyder	1971	September 23, 1971	Harvard (1971)	none

William Rehnquist

January 7, 1972 –
September 26, 1986^{CJ}

Clerk	Started	Finished	School (year)	Previous clerkship
Frederick W. Lambert	January 7, 1972	July 1972	Michigan (1969)	S. Barnes (9th Cir.)
Michael J. Meehan	January 7, 1972	July 1972	Arizona (1971)	none
Allen R. Snyder	January 7, 1972	July 1972	Harvard (1971)	Harlan II
L. Gordon Harriss	1972	1973	Columbia (1971)	Hays (2d Cir.)
James A. Strain	1972	1973	Indiana (1969)	Hastings (7th Cir.)
Robert W. Wild	1972	1973	Cornell (1970)	none
C. Michael Buxton	1973	1974	Kentucky (1971)	none
H. Bartow Farr, III	1973	1974	Arizona State (1973)	none
Fredericka Paff (Church)	1973	1974	Stanford (1969)	Duniway (9th Cir.)
William S. Jacobs	1974	1975	Duke (1973)	G. Bell (5th Cir.)
John M. Nannes	1974	1975	Michigan (1973)	R. Robb (D.C. Cir.)
John E. O'Neill	1974	1975	Texas (1973)	none
Craig M. Bradley	1975	1976	Virginia (1970)	none
William S. Eggeling	1975	1976	Boston University (1974)	L. Campbell (1st Cir.)
John M. Mason	1975	1976	Washington & Lee (1973)	
Donald B. Ayer	1976	1977	Harvard (1975)	Wilkey (D.C. Cir.)
Michael Q. Eagan	1976	1977	Stanford (1974)	Sneed (9th Cir.)
Thomas H. Jackson	1976	1977	Yale (1975)	Frankel (S.D.N.Y.)
Barton H. Thompson, Jr.	1977	1978	Stanford (1976)	Sneed (9th Cir.)
Michael B. Wallace	1977	1978	Virginia (1976)	H. Walker (Miss.)
Michael K. Young	1977	1978	Harvard (1976)	Kaplan (Mass.)
Charles J. Cooper	1978	1979	Alabama (1977)	Roney (5th Cir.)
Robert T. Haar	1978	1979	Yale (1977)	Leventhal (D.C. Cir.)
Mark R. Kravitz	1978	1979	Georgetown (1975)	Hunter (3d Cir.)
James R. Asperger	1979	1980	UCLA (1978)	Mosk (Cal.)
Maureen E. Mahoney	1979	1980	Chicago (1978)	Sprecher (7th Cir.)
W. Thomas McGough	1979	1980	Virginia (1978)	Seitz (3d Cir.)
Dean C. Colson	1980	1981	Miami (1979)	Fay (5th Cir.)
Robert B. Knauss	1980	1981	Michigan (1979)	Mansfield (2d Cir.)
John G. Roberts, Jr.	1980	1981	Harvard (1979)	Friendly (2d Cir.)
David G. Campbell	1981	1982	Utah (1979)	J. C. Wallace (9th Cir.)
Brett L. Dunkelman	1981	1982	Arizona (1980)	Copple (D. Ariz.)
Parker C. Folse, III	1981	1982	Texas (1980)	Sneed (9th Cir.)
Ronald L. Blunt	1982	1983	Missouri (1981)	R. Robb (D.C. Cir.)
Gary B. Born	1982	1983	Penn (1981)	Friendly (2d Cir.)
David B. Jaffe	1982	1983	Chicago (1981)	Browning (9th Cir.)
Michael K. Kellogg	1983	1984	Harvard (1982)	Wilkey (D.C. Cir.)
Scott G. Knudson	1983	1984	Minnesota (1982)	Tamm (D.C. Cir.)
Kerri L. Martin (Bartlett)	1983	1984	Virginia (1982)	Hunter (3d Cir.)
John C. Englander	1984	1985	Boston University (1983)	Aldrich (1st Cir.)
William F. Jung	1984	1985	Illinois (1983)	Tjoflat (11th Cir.)
Alan B. Vickery	1984	1985	Columbia (1983)	Feinberg (2d Cir.)
Randall D. Guynn	1985	1986	Virginia (1984)	J. C. Wallace (9th Cir.)
Joseph L. Hoffmann	1985	1986	Washington (1984)	Kravitch (11th Cir.)
H. Geoffrey Moulton	1985	1986	Columbia (1984)	Feinberg (2d Cir.)

Antonin Scalia

September 26, 1986 –
February 13, 2016

Clerk	Started	Finished	School (year)	Previous clerkship
Gary S. Lawson	1986	1987	Yale (1983)	Scalia (D.C. Cir.)
Lee Liberman (Otis)	1986	1987	Chicago (1983)	Scalia (D.C. Cir.)
Roy W. McLeese III	1986	1987	NYU (1985)	Scalia (D.C. Cir.)
Gene C. Schaerr (shared with Burger)	1986	1987	Yale (1985)	Starr (D.C. Cir.)
Patrick J. Schiltz	1986	1987	Harvard (1985)	Scalia (D.C. Cir.)
Richard D. Bernstein	1987	1988	Columbia (1986)	Kearse (2d Cir.)
Steven G. Calabresi	1987	1988	Yale (1983)	Bork (D.C. Cir.) / R. Winter (2d Cir.)
Paul T. Cappuccio	1987	1988	Harvard (1986)	Kozinski (9th Cir.)
Gregory S. Dovel (shared with Burger)	1987	1988	Harvard (1986)	Wallace (9th Cir.)
Robert H. Tiller	1987	1988	Virginia (1986)	Williams (D.C. Cir.)
Wendy E. Ackerman	1988	1989	Chicago (1987)	Williams (D.C. Cir.)
Richard P. Bress	1988	1989	Stanford (1987)	Williams (D.C. Cir.)
D. Cameron Findlay	1988	1989	Harvard (1987)	Williams (D.C. Cir.)
William K. Kelley (shared with Burger)	1988	1989	Harvard (1987)	Starr (D.C. Cir.)
John F. Manning	1988	1989	Harvard (1985)	Bork (D.C. Cir.)
Bradford R. Clark	1989	1990	Columbia (1985)	Bork (D.C. Cir.)
Bruce L. Hay	1989	1990	Harvard (1988)	Norris (9th Cir.)
Von G. Keetch (shared with Burger)	1989	1990	BYU (1987)	Pratt (2d Cir.)
Kristin A. Linsley (Myles)	1989	1990	Harvard (1988)	D. Ginsburg (D.C. Cir.)
Henry Weissmann	1989	1990	Yale (1987)	Buckley (D.C. Cir.)
Christopher Landau	1990	1991	Harvard (1989)	Thomas (D.C. Cir.)
L. Lawrence Lessig	1990	1991	Yale (1989)	Posner (7th Cir.)
Alan J. Meese	1990	1991	Chicago (1989)	Easterbrook (7th Cir.)
Michael D. Ramsey	1990	1991	Stanford (1989)	Wallace (9th Cir.)
Brian D. Boyle	1991	1992	Harvard (1986)	Silberman (D.C. Cir.)
Daniel P. Collins	1991	1992	Stanford (1988)	D. W. Nelson (9th Cir.)
Jeffrey S. Sutton (shared with Powell)	1991	1992	Ohio State (1990)	Meskill (2d Cir.)
M. Edward Whelan III	1991	1992	Harvard (1985)	Wallace (9th Cir.)
Jeffrey M. Wintner	1991	1992	Harvard (1989)	Silberman (D.C. Cir.)
Alex M. Azar II	1992	1993	Yale (1991)	Luttig (4th Cir.)
John F. Duffy	1992	1993	Chicago (1989)	Williams (D.C. Cir.)
David E. Nahmias	1992	1993	Harvard (1991)	Silberman (D.C. Cir.)
Andrew J. Nussbaum	1992	1993	Chicago (1991)	R. B. Ginsburg (D.C. Cir.)
Paul D. Clement	1993	1994	Harvard (1992)	Silberman (D.C. Cir.)
Louis E. Feldman	1993	1994	Penn (1992)	Wallace (9th Cir.)
Mark R. Filip	1993	1994	Harvard (1992)	Williams (D.C. Cir.)
Emmet T. Flood	1993	1994	Yale (1991)	Winter (2d Cir.)
Griffith L. Green	1994	1995	Chicago (1993)	Luttig (4th Cir.)
Joan L. Larsen	1994	1995	Northwestern (1993)	Sentelle (D.C. Cir.)
Howard Shelanski	1994	1995	Berkeley (1992)	Williams (D.C. Cir.) / Pollak (E.D. Pa.)
C. Adrian Vermeule	1994	1995	Harvard (1993)	Sentelle (D.C. Cir.)
Kathleen S. Beecher (Moore)	1995	1996	Yale (1993)	R. Winter (2d Cir.)
Charles Sarsfield Duggan	1995	1996	Harvard (1994)	Silberman (D.C. Cir.)
Joseph D. Kearney	1995	1996	Harvard (1989)	O'Scannlain (9th Cir.)
Theodore W. Ullyot	1995	1996	Chicago (1994)	Luttig (4th Cir.)
John E. Fee	1996	1997	Chicago (1995)	Easterbrook (7th Cir.)
Christine M. Jolls	1996	1997	Harvard (1993)	Williams (D.C. Cir.)
Howard M. Radzely	1996	1997	Harvard (1995)	Luttig (4th Cir.)
Glen E. Summers	1996	1997	Penn (1994)	J. C. Wallace (9th Cir.)
J. Scott Ballenger	1997	1998	Virginia (1996)	J. C. Wallace (9th Cir.)
Anthony J. Bellia, Jr.	1997	1998	Notre Dame (1994)	O'Scannlain (9th Cir.) / Skretny (W.D.N.Y.)
Noel J. Francisco	1997	1998	Chicago (1996)	Luttig (4th Cir.)
Rachel Barkow	1997	1998	Harvard (1996)	Silberman (D.C. Cir.)
Amy Coney (Barrett)	1998	1999	Notre Dame (1997)	Silberman (D.C. Cir.)
Kevin B. Huff	1998	1999	Columbia (1996)	D. Ginsburg (D.C. Cir.) / Cote (S.D.N.Y.)
Ara Lovitt	1998	1999	Stanford (1997)	Luttig (4th Cir.)
Stephen A. Miller	1998	1999	Northwestern (1997)	Flaum (7th Cir.)
Jordan B. Hansell	1999	2000	Michigan (1998)	Wilkinson (4th Cir.)
Joel D. Kaplan	1999	2000	Harvard (1998)	Luttig (4th Cir.)
Kannon K. Shanmugam	1999	2000	Harvard (1998)	Luttig (4th Cir.)
Mary Beth Brookshire Young	1999	2000	Chicago (1998)	Sentelle (D.C. Cir.)
Kevin P. Martin	2000	2001	Columbia (1999)	Silberman (D.C. Cir.)
Julian W. Poon	2000	2001	Harvard (1999)	Luttig (4th Cir.)
Aaron D. Van Oort	2000	2001	Chicago (1999)	Posner (7th Cir.)
Eric B. Wolff	2000	2001	Berkeley (1998)	Williams (D.C. Cir.) / W. Fletcher (9th Cir.)
Shay Dvoretzky	2001	2002	Yale (2000)	Luttig (4th Cir.)
Susan Elisabeth Engel	2001	2002	NYU (2000)	Kozinski (9th Cir.)
Brian T. Fitzpatrick	2001	2002	Harvard (2000)	O'Scannlain (9th Cir.)
Edward R. Morrison	2001	2002	Chicago (2000)	Posner (7th Cir.)
Jonathan F. Mitchell	2002	2003	Chicago (2001)	Luttig (4th Cir.)
Brian J. Murray	2002	2003	Notre Dame (2001)	O'Scannlain (9th Cir.)
John C. O'Quinn	2002	2003	Harvard (2001)	Sentelle (D.C. Cir.)
Gil Seinfeld	2002	2003	Harvard (2000)	Calabresi (2d Cir.)
Benjamin L. Hatch	2003	2004	Harvard (2002)	Luttig (4th Cir.)
C. Scott Hemphill	2003	2004	Stanford (2001)	Posner (7th Cir.)
Robert K. Kry	2003	2004	Yale (2002)	Kozinski (9th Cir.)
Kevin C. Walsh	2003	2004	Harvard (2002)	Niemeyer (4th Cir.)
Curtis E. Gannon	2004	2005	Chicago (1998)	E. Jones (5th Cir.)
William M. Jay	2004	2005	Harvard (2001)	O'Scannlain (9th Cir.)
Tara S. Kole	2004	2005	Harvard (2003)	Kozinski (9th Cir.)
John R. Phillips	2004	2005	Chicago (2003)	Luttig (4th Cir.)
John Demers	2005	2006	Harvard (1999)	O'Scannlain (9th Cir.)
Scott P. Martin	2005	2006	Columbia (2004)	Kozinski (9th Cir.)
D. John Sauer	2005	2006	Harvard (2004)	Luttig (4th Cir.)
Evan A. Young	2005	2006	Yale (2004)	Wilkinson (4th Cir.)
Daniel Bress	2006	2007	Virginia (2005)	Wilkinson (4th Cir.)
Louis A. Chaiten	2006	2007	Northwestern (1998)	Sutton (6th Cir.)
Joshua Seth Lipshutz	2006	2007	Stanford (2005)	Kozinski (9th Cir.)
Hashim M. "Hash" Mooppan	2006	2007	Harvard (2005)	Luttig (4th Cir.)
Aditya Bamzai	2007	2008	Chicago (2004)	Sutton (6th Cir.)
John F. Bash III	2007	2008	Harvard (2006)	Kavanaugh (D.C. Cir.)
Bryan M. Killian	2007	2008	Harvard (2005)	Niemeyer (4th Cir.)
Rachel Kovner	2007	2008	Stanford (2006)	Wilkinson (4th Cir.)
Jameson R. Jones	2008	2009	Stanford (2007)	Sutton (6th Cir.)
Jacob (Yaakov) Roth	2008	2009	Harvard (2007)	Boudin (1st Cir.)
Moshe Y. Spinowitz	2008	2009	Harvard (2006)	Boudin (1st Cir.)
David C. Thompson	2008	2009	Stanford (2007)	Kozinski (9th Cir.)
Jonathan C. Bond	2009	2010	GW (2008)	Sutton (6th Cir.)
Steven P. Lehotsky	2009	2010	Harvard (2002)	D. Ginsburg (D.C. Cir.)
Daniel M. Sullivan	2009	2010	Chicago (2008)	O'Scannlain (9th Cir.)
Katherine Ireland Twomey	2009	2010	Virginia (2008)	Wilkinson (4th Cir.)
Robert W. Allen	2010	2011	Harvard (2009)	Boudin (1st Cir.)
Matthew S. Owen	2010	2011	Michigan (2008)	Gorsuch (10th Cir.)
Adam G. Unikowsky	2010	2011	Harvard (2007)	D. Ginsburg (D.C. Cir.)
Jason M. Wilcox	2010	2011	Chicago (2009)	Sutton (6th Cir.)
Donald Burke	2011	2012	Virginia (2008)	Kethledge (6th Cir.)
Rebecca Taibleson	2011	2012	Yale (2010)	Kavanaugh (D.C. Cir.)
Carlo D. ("Carl") Marchioli	2011	2012	Harvard (2010)	Colloton (8th Cir.)
John S. Moran	2011	2012	Virginia (2010)	Sutton (6th Cir.)
Adam Israel Klein	2012	2013	Columbia (2011)	Kavanaugh (D.C. Cir.)
Ian James Samuel	2012	2013	NYU (2008)	Kozinski (9th Cir.)
Danielle Renee Sassoon	2012	2013	Yale (2011)	Wilkinson (4th Cir.)
Eric C. Tung	2012	2013	Chicago (2010)	Gorsuch (10th Cir.)
Katherine Mims Crocker	2013	2014	Virginia (2012)	Wilkinson (4th Cir.)
Kevin Franz King	2013	2014	Northwestern (2010)	Niemeyer (4th Cir.) / Randolph (D.C. Cir.)
Paul Alessio Mezzina	2013	2014	Harvard (2008)	Kavanaugh (D.C. Cir.)
Ryan Joseph Walsh	2013	2014	Chicago (2012)	O'Scannlain (9th Cir.)
Samuel Earl Eckman	2014	2015	Chicago (2013)	Kozinski (9th Cir.)
Benjamin M. Flowers	2014	2015	Chicago (2012)	Ikuta (9th Cir.)
Judd Stone	2014	2015	Northwestern (2010)	E. Jones (5th Cir.) / Winfree (Alaska)
Vivek Suri	2014	2015	Harvard (2013)	Sutton (6th Cir.)
Sopan Joshi	2015	February 13, 2016	Northwestern (2013)	Feinerman (N.D. Ill.) / Posner (7th Cir)
Michael E. Kenneally	2015	February 13, 2016	Harvard (2011)	Gorsuch (10th Cir.)
Taylor A.R. Meehan	2015	February 13, 2016	Chicago (2013)	W. Pryor (11th Cir.)
Jonathan D. Urick	2015	February 13, 2016	Virginia (2013)	Sutton (6th Cir.) / Thapar (E.D. Ky.)

Neil Gorsuch

April 10, 2017 –
Incumbent

Clerk	Started	Finished	School (year)	Previous clerkship
Michael R. Davis	April 10, 2017	2017	Iowa (2004)	Gorsuch (10th Cir.)
Jamil N. Jaffer	April 10, 2017	2017	Chicago (2003)	E. Jones (5th Cir.) / Gorsuch (10th Cir.)
Jane E. Kucera (Nitze)	April 10, 2017	2017	Harvard (2008)	Sotomayor / Gorsuch (10th Cir.)
Matthew S. Owen	April 10, 2017	2018	Michigan (2008)	Scalia / Gorsuch (10th Cir.)
David J. Feder	2017	2018	Harvard (2014)	Gorsuch (10th Cir.)
Eric C. Tung	2017	2018	Chicago (2010)	Scalia / Gorsuch (10th Cir.)
Lucas M. Walker	2017	2018	Harvard (2009)	Alito / Gorsuch (10th Cir.)
Tobi Merritt Edwards (Young)	2018	2019	Mississippi (2003)	Holmes (10th Cir.)
Ethan P. Davis	2018	2019	Yale (2008)	O'Scannlain (9th Cir.)
Paul Alessio Mezzina	2018	2019	Harvard (2008)	Kavanaugh (D.C. Cir.) / Scalia
Jeffrey T. Quilici	2018	2019	Texas (2012)	Gorsuch (10th Cir.)
Alexander Kazam (Hired by Kennedy)	2018	2019	Yale (2016)	Kethledge (6th Cir.) / R. Sullivan (S.D.N.Y.)
Kelly C. Holt	2019	2020	Chicago (2017)	Wilkinson (4th Cir.)
Stephen C. Yelderman	2019	2020	Chicago (2010)	Gorsuch (10th Cir.)
Michael L. Francisco	2019	2020	Cornell (2007)	Tymkovich (10th Cir.)
Kurt A. Johnson	2019	2020	Michigan (2015)	Wilkinson (4th Cir.)
Clayton Kozinski (shared with Kennedy)	2019	2020	Yale (2017)	Kavanaugh (D.C. Cir.)
James M. Burnham	2020	2021	Chicago (2009)	Kozinski (9th Cir.)
Trevor W. Ezell	2020	2021	Stanford (2017)	Sutton (6th Cir.) / Oldham (5th Cir.)
Krista J. Perry (Heckmann)	2020	2021	Chicago (2016)	Kennedy / W. Pryor (11th Cir.)
John D. Ramer	2020	2021	Michigan (2017)	Kethledge (6th Cir.)
Stephanie Hall Barclay	2021	2022	BYU (2011)	N.R. Smith (9th Cir.)
Louis J. Capozzi	2021	2022	Penn (2019)	Wilkinson (4th Cir.) / Scirica (3d Cir.)
Mark Storslee	2021	2022	Stanford (2015)	O'Scannlain (9th Cir.)
John Henry Thompson	2021	2022	Chicago (2018)	Griffith (D.C. Cir.) / Sykes (7th Cir.)
Tara Helfman	July 2022	December 2022	Yale (2006)	none
Kyle B. Grigel	2022	2023	Stanford (2019)	Sutton (6th Cir.)
David K. Suska	2022	2023	Chicago (2016)	Easterbook (7th Cir.)
Lael D. Weinberger	2022	2023	Oak Brook College of Law and Government Policy (2009) / Chicago (2018)	Easterbook (7th Cir.) / Eismann (Idaho)
Trevor W. Ezell	January 2023	June 2023	Stanford (2017)	Gorsuch / Sutton (6th Cir.) / Oldham (5th Cir.)
Joshua Halpern	2023	2024	Harvard (2017)	Millett (D.C. Cir.) / J.E. Smith (5th Cir.)
Isabelle Hanna	2023	2024	Yale (2020)	Kethledge (6th Cir.) / Grant (11th Cir.)
Adam I. Steene	2023	2024	Northwestern (2012) (L.L.M) / University of Law (2014)	Oldham (5th Cir.) / W. Pryor (11th Cir.)
John W. Tienken	2023	2024	Chicago (2018)	Thapar (6th Cir.) / Oldham (5th Cir.)
Christian Burset	2024	2025	Yale (2014)	Cabranes (2d Cir.)
Rachel L. Daley	2024	2025	Virginia (2021)	Oldham (5th Cir.) / Thapar (6th Cir.)
Chadwick (Chad) Harper	2024	2025	Harvard (2019)	Oldham (5th Cir.) / Newsom (11th Cir.)
Edward L. Pickup	2024	2025	Oxford (2017) / Yale (2021)	Bibas (3d Cir.) / Walker (D.C. Cir.)
Jacob Altik	2025	2026	Michigan (2021)	Larsen (6th Cir.) / Rao (D.C. Cir.)
Shai Berman	2025	2026	Columbia (2020)	Menashi (2d Cir.) / Korman (E.D.N.Y.)
Alexi Ehrlich	2025	2026	Michigan (2021)	Bibas (3d Cir.) / McFadden (D.D.C.)
Micah Quigley	2025	2026	Chicago (2021)	Oldham (5th Cir.) / Rao (D.C. Cir.)
Jason Altabet	2026		Harvard (2022)	Lamberth (D.D.C.) / Bumatay (9th Cir.)
Lucas Funk	2026		Northwestern (2020)	Bumatay (9th Cir.) / Moreno (S.D. Fla.)
Tyler Lindley	2026		Chicago (2021)	W. Pryor (11th Cir.) / Katsas (D.C. Cir.)
Matthew Rittman	2026		Chicago (2023)	Oldham (5th Cir.) / Katsas (D.C. Cir.)
Sydney Engle	2027		Duke (2023)	Willett (5th Cir.) / Sutton (6th Cir.)
Gavin Landgraf	2027		Yale (2023)	Sullivan (2d Cir.) / Rao (D.C. Cir.)
Declan Kunkel	2028		Yale (2024)	Thapar (6th Cir.) / Oldham (5th Cir.)
Benjamin "Ben" Pontz	2028		Harvard (2024)	Kethledge (6th Cir.) / Beaton (W.D. Ky.)

== Additional sources ==
- Baier, Paul R. (1973). "The Law Clerks: Profile of an Institution," Vanderbilt L. Rev. 26: 1125–77.
- "Georgia Law Alumni Who Have Clerked for a U.S. Supreme Court Justice," Advocate, Spring/Summer 2004 (listing 6 names).
- Judicial Clerkship Handbook, USC Gould Law School, 2013-2014, p. 33, Appendix B.
- Newland, Charles A. (June 1961). "Personal Assistants to the Supreme Court Justices: The Law Clerks," Oregon L. Rev. 40: 306–07.
- News of Supreme Court clerks. University of Virginia Law School, list of clerks, 2004-2018.
- University of Michigan clerks to the Supreme Court, 1991-2017, University of Michigan Law School Web site (2016). Retrieved September 20, 2016.
- Ward, Artemus and David L. Weiden (2006). Sorcerers' Apprentices: 100 Years of Law Clerks at the United States Supreme Court. New York, NY: New York University Press. ISBN 978-0-8147-9420-3, ISBN 978-0-8147-9420-3.
