= District of Columbia Bar =

Association of lawyers in the US

- Type: Legal society
- Headquarters: Washington, DC
- Location: United States
- Members: 100,000+
- Website: dcbar.org

The District of Columbia Bar (DCB) is the mandatory bar association of the local (non-federal) courts in the District of Columbia. It administers the admissions, licensing, and discipline functions for lawyers licensed to practice in the local (non-federal) courts of The District of Columbia, including DC Superior Court and the appellate DC Court of Appeals.

It is to be distinguished from the Bar Association of the District of Columbia, which is a voluntary bar.

== History ==
Congress first established judicial courts for the District of Columbia in an act of February 27, 1801, but it wasn't until 1871 that the Bar Association of the District of Columbia formed as a voluntary association to support lawyers practicing in those courts. Membership in that organization was restricted to whites, so non-white lawyers formed the otherwise similar Washington Bar Association. The BADC was integrated in the mid-1950s but the two organizations remain separate, and membership in either remained voluntary.

Until 1970, the US District Court maintained admissions and discipline through its Committee on Admissions and Grievances; it was not heavily funded, criticized for laxity and known for not disbarring lawyers for misconduct. In 1956, the Judicial Conference of the DC Circuit recommended the establishment of a unified bar in the District of Columbia, but this required an Act of Congress for which there was insufficient support.

Calls for establishing a mandatory bar, as a means of curbing unethical lawyering, was stalled by conservative opposition in Congress, until the Nixon Administration decided to support a general reorganization of the DC courts, to reduce the power of judges the administration considered too liberal. Removing lawyer discipline from the direct purview of the courts and vesting it in a mandatory bar association was a feature of the District of Columbia Court Reform and Criminal Procedure Act of 1970 (84 Stat. 473). Following that act, the District of Columbia Court of Appeals assumed jurisdiction over licensing and discipline from the District Court, and appointed a committee to establish the District of Columbia Bar. The bar came into existence on January 1, 1973 and elected E. Barrett Prettyman Jr. as its First President.

== Functioning ==
The DCB is governed by a board of governors composed of 20 lawyers selected by the active membership and three members of the public appointed by the bar itself as nonvoting members.

The DCB registers lawyers and operates a lawyer disciplinary system, maintains a Clients’ Security Fund, and performs other administrative, educational and public service programs.
