= John F. Duffy =

American lawyer (born 1963)

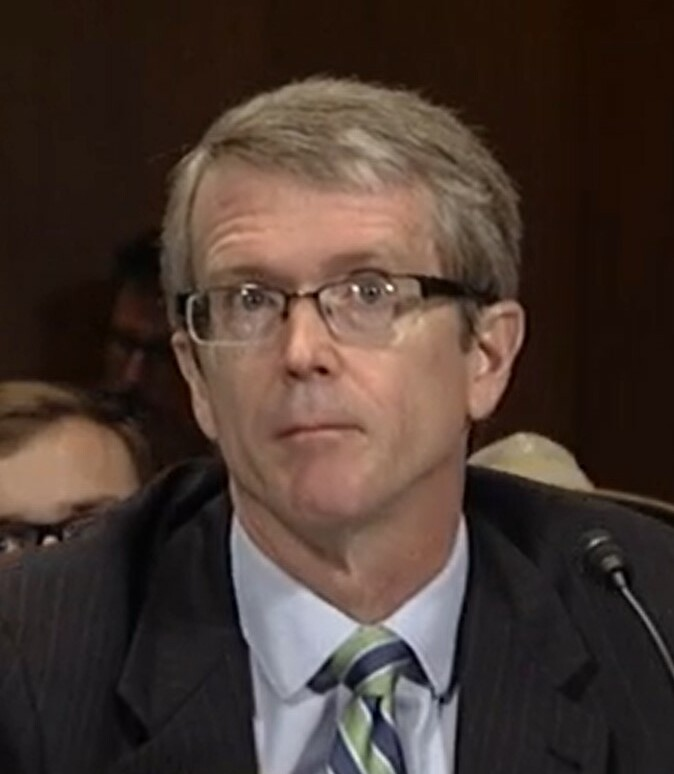
- Duffy in 2017
- Born: November 22, 1963 (age 62)

Academic background
- Education: Harvard University (BA); University of Chicago (JD)

Academic work
- Discipline: Law
- Institutions: University of Virginia School of Law

John Fitzgerald Duffy (born November 22, 1963) is Professor of Law at the University of Virginia School of Law in Charlottesville, Virginia. He is a legal commentator and author who has co-authored a scholarly book on patent law. He previously was a law clerk for Antonin Scalia, former associate justice of the Supreme Court of the United States, and for Stephen F. Williams, on the United States Court of Appeals for the District of Columbia Circuit. Between these two assignments, he was an attorney in the Office of Legal Counsel in the United States Department of Justice.

Duffy was appointed as General Counsel for the United States Patent and Trademark Office in 2026. He was sworn in on October 5, 2026, at the Dolley Madison House, by Judge Ryan T. Holte of the United States Court of Federal Claims.

Duffy received a Bachelor of Arts in physics from Harvard University in 1985 and was awarded a J.D. degree by the University of Chicago Law School in 1989. Duffy is a graduate of Holy Spirit High School in Absecon, New Jersey.

== Patent reform ==
Professor Duffy has called for the demonopolization of the US and other patent offices as a means for improving the efficiency and thoroughness of patent examination.

== Books ==
- (With Herz, Michael). A Guide to Judicial and Political Review of Federal Agencies. Chicago: American Bar Association, Section of Administrative Law and Regulatory Practice, 2005.
- (with Merges, Robert Patrick). Patent Law and Policy: Cases and Materials. 4th ed.. Newark, NJ: LexisNexis, 2007.

== See also ==
- Demonopolization
- List of law clerks for the ninth seat of the Supreme Court of the United States
