= Brian T. Fitzpatrick =

American academic and lawyer

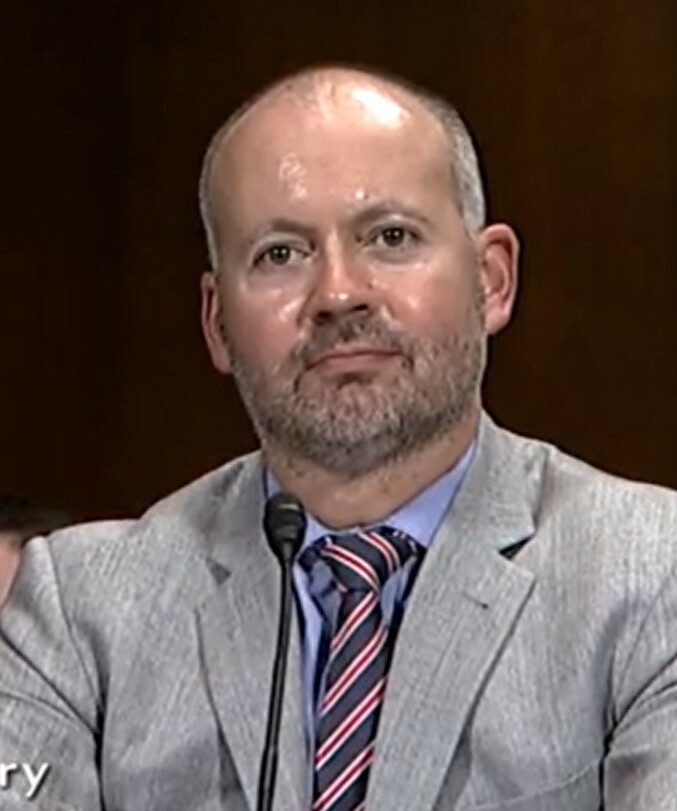
- Fitzpatrick in 2018
- Born: May 9, 1975 (age 51)
- Occupation: Law professor

Academic background
- Education: University of Notre Dame (BS); Harvard University (JD)

Academic work
- Discipline: Law
- Sub-discipline: Class Action; Textualism; Originalism
- Institutions: Vanderbilt University Law School

Brian Timothy Fitzpatrick (born May 9, 1975) is an American legal scholar. Fitzpatrick is known for his unorthodox advocacy of class action lawsuits from a conservative point of view, and is the author of a book on the subject, The Conservative Case for Class Actions (University of Chicago Press, 2019).

== Education ==
Fitzpatrick graduated second in his class from the University of Notre Dame with a Bachelor of Science, summa cum laude, in chemical engineering in 1997. He then attended Harvard Law School, where he became an editor of the Harvard Law Review and the Harvard Journal of Law & Public Policy, and graduated with a Juris Doctor (J.D.), magna cum laude, in 2000. As a law student, he was awarded the Fay Diploma for having the highest combined grade point average in the class.

== Career ==
Fitzpatrick joined Vanderbilt University Law School in 2007 after spending time as a John M. Olin Fellow at the New York University School of Law. He has clerked for Judge Diarmuid O'Scannlain of the United States Court of Appeals for the Ninth Circuit and Associate Justice Antonin Scalia of the Supreme Court of the United States. Between his time as a clerk and professor, Fitzpatrick worked as an associate in Sidley Austin's Washington, D.C. office and as Special Counsel for Supreme Court Nominations to Senator John Cornyn. He teaches several courses at Vanderbilt, including Federal Courts, Civil Procedure, Complex Litigation, and a seminar on textualism and originalism.

== See also ==
- List of law clerks for the ninth seat of the Supreme Court of the United States
