= C. Scott Hemphill =

American legal academic

C. Scott Hemphill is a legal academic whose scholarship focuses on intellectual property law and antitrust law. He is currently a Professor of Law at New York University Law School, where he has taught since 2015. Previously, Hemphill was a Professor of Law at Columbia Law School.

Hemphill's research has been cited by both the U.S. Supreme Court and the California Supreme Court.

== Education and early career ==
Hemphill graduated with an A.B., magna cum laude, in Social Studies from Harvard College in 1994. He then attended the London School of Economics as a Fulbright Scholar and received his M.Sc. in Economics in 1997. In 2001, Hemphill graduated with a J.D., first in his class, from Stanford Law School, where he edited the Stanford Law Review. He also holds a Ph.D. in Economics from Stanford University.

Following his graduation from law school, Hemphill clerked for Judge Richard Posner of the U.S. Court of Appeals for the Seventh Circuit and for Justice Antonin Scalia of the U.S. Supreme Court.

== Academic career ==
Hemphill joined the faculty of Columbia Law School in 2006, where he became a Professor of Law in 2010. Hemphill's scholarship focuses on topics relating to antitrust and intellectual property law, including pharmaceutical patents, network neutrality, copyright, and the fashion industry. The U.S. Supreme Court cited Hemphill's research on "pay-for-delay" pharmaceutical patent settlements in its majority opinion in FTC v. Actavis, Inc..

Hemphill has testified multiple times before the U.S. House of Representatives. In May 2014, Hemphill testified on the Comcast-Time Warner Cable merger before the House Judiciary Committee’s Subcommittee on Regulatory Reform, Commercial and Antitrust Law. In June 2014, Hemphill offered testimony regarding patent regulation in the pharmaceutical industry before the House Energy and Commerce Committee.

Hemphill was ranked 59 in the list of the top 100 legal scholars of 2024 curated by researchers at George Mason University. From 2011 to 2012, Hemphill served as the Chief of the Antitrust Bureau in the Office of the Attorney General of the State of New York.

== Publications ==
Hemphill's work has been published in the Stanford Law Review, NYU Law Review, Yale Law Journal, and Columbia Law Review, He has also published in Science and has written on the fashion industry (with Harvard Law professor Jeannie Suk) in The Wall Street Journal and Slate.

== See also ==
- List of law clerks for the ninth seat of the Supreme Court of the United States
