= Lloyd L. Weinreb =

American law professor (1936–2021)

- Born: October 9, 1936
- Died: December 15, 2021 (aged 85)

Academic background
- Education: Dartmouth College (BA); Oxford University (BA, MA); Harvard Law School (LL.B.)

Academic work
- Discipline: Law
- Institutions: Fordham Law School; Harvard Law School
- Main interests: Criminal law Criminal procedure Intellectual property Legal philosophy Political philosophy

Lloyd L. Weinreb (October 9, 1936 – December 15, 2021) was an American legal scholar. He was a professor at Harvard Law School (a chair once held by Joseph Story). He was first appointed to the HLS faculty in 1965 and became a full professor in 1968.

== Biography ==
Weinreb received bachelor's degrees from Dartmouth College (1957) and Oxford University (1959; M.A., 1963) before taking his LL.B. from Harvard Law School in 1962. He has spent several semesters as a visiting professor at Fordham Law School.

Prior to beginning his teaching career, Lloyd Weinreb served as a clerk for John Marshall Harlan II of the United States Supreme Court, and then as a criminal prosecutor in Washington, D.C.

His research interests included criminal law, criminal procedure, intellectual property, and legal and political philosophy.

Despite lacking the celebrity professor status of some of his colleagues at Harvard Law School, Professor Weinreb was highly regarded by students and faculty. He was described as "a remarkable model of competence and clarity". The Harvard Law Record ranked him among the 'ten professors whose classes you won't want to miss'.

== Notable publications ==
- Leading Constitutional Cases on Criminal Justice (Foundation Press 2007).
- Legal Reason. The Use of Analogy in Legal Argument (Cambridge University Press 2005).
- Oedipus at Fenway Park:What Rights Are and Why There Are Any (Harvard University Press 1994).

== Recent law review articles ==
- "A Secular Theory of Natural Law," 72 Fordham Law Review 2287 (2004).
- "Integrity in Government," 72 Fordham Law Review 421 (2003).

== See also ==
- List of law clerks for the ninth seat of the Supreme Court of the United States
