= Randall D. Guynn =

American lawyer

- Born: Randall David Guynn; October 13, 1957 (age 68)
- Education: Brigham Young University; University of Virginia School of Law (JD)
- Occupation: Lawyer
- Spouse: Robin (née Quinn)
- Children: 7

Randall David Guynn (born October 13, 1957) is an American bank regulatory and bank mergers and acquisitions lawyer.

== Biography ==
In 1981, Guynn was graduated from Brigham Young University, and in 1984 from the University of Virginia School of Law with a J.D. Between 1984 and 1985, Guynn was a clerk for John Clifford Wallace, United States Court of Appeals for the Ninth Circuit, and from 1985 to 1986 he was a clerk for the William Rehnquist, U.S. Supreme Court.

In 1986, Guynn joined Davis Polk & Wardwell and in 1993 became a partner. He practiced in the Paris office from 1988 to 1990 and returned to Europe for a five-year period in the London office from 1994 to 1999. Currently, Guynn is head of Davis Polk's Financial Institutions Group and works in financial regulatory reform. He has advised institutions including The Clearing House Association and the Securities Industry and Financial Markets Association. He has been a guest lecturer on bank regulation at Harvard and Pennsylvania Law Schools, and frequently speaks on panels at bank regulatory conferences.

Guynn is active in several bar associations. He is a member of the Committee Chairs Council of the J. Reuben Clark Law Society Conference, and at a 2017 conference Philadelphia he took part in a panel discussion addressing "Financial Regulatory Reform in the Trump Administration". He is a member of the International Bar Association, the American Bar Association, and the New York City Bar Association. He is a member of the Executive Committee and chair of the National Advisory Board for the Constitutional Sources Project. Guynn co-chairs the Bipartisan Policy Center's Failure Resolution Task Force. He is a member of the 1994 class of the French-American Foundation. He is the founder and currently on the Board of Directors of ConSource, which is an online library of constitutional history.

Guynn is a member of the Federalist Society. On February 17, 2015, he was a guest on the Society's Financial Services & E-Commerce Practice Group podcast, "Single Point of Entry – A Response to Paul Kupiec and Peter Wallison." In 2013, he was a speaker at the Society's National Lawyers Convention.

== Awards ==
In 2017, Guynn was named a "thought leader" in banking by Who's Who Legal.

== See also ==
- List of law clerks for the ninth seat of the Supreme Court of the United States
