= J. Michael Luttig =

American jurist (born 1954)

Michael Luttig
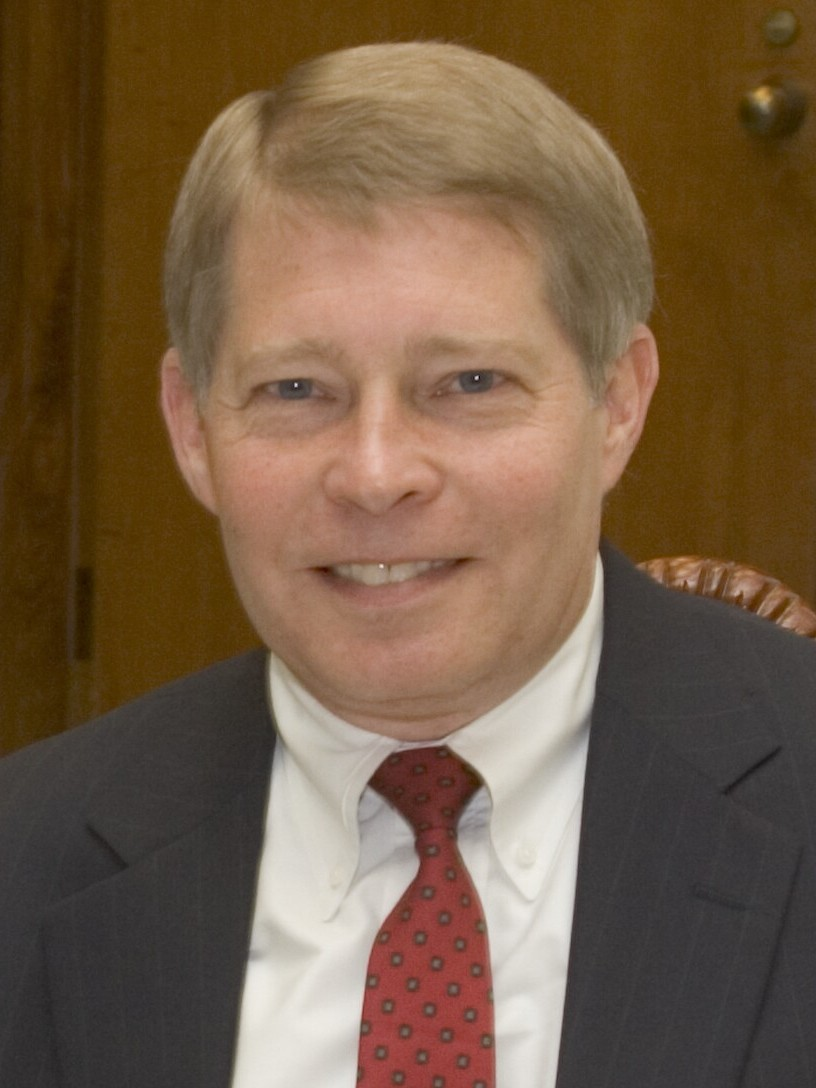
- Luttig in 2005

Judge of the United States Court of Appeals for the Fourth Circuit
- In office August 2, 1991 – May 10, 2006
- Appointed by: George H. W. Bush
- Preceded by: Seat established
- Succeeded by: G. Steven Agee

United States Assistant Attorney General for the Office of Legal Counsel
- In office May 26, 1990 – August 2, 1991
- President: George H. W. Bush
- Preceded by: William Barr
- Succeeded by: Timothy Flanigan

Personal details
- Born: John Michael Luttig; June 13, 1954 (age 72) Tyler, Texas, U.S.
- Education: Washington and Lee University (BA); University of Virginia (JD)

John Michael Luttig (/ˈluːtɪɡ/ LOO-tig; born June 13, 1954) is an American lawyer and jurist who served as a U.S. circuit judge on the United States Court of Appeals for the Fourth Circuit from 1991 to 2006. Luttig resigned his judgeship in 2006 to become the general counsel of Boeing, a position he held until his retirement in 2019.

An influential conservative legal figure, Luttig gained broader prominence after the presidency of Donald Trump, characterizing him as "a clear and present danger to American democracy," and advocated invoking the Fourteenth Amendment to render Trump ineligible to serve a second term as president.

Luttig is a senior fellow at the Kettering Foundation, an American non-partisan research foundation.

== Early life and education ==
Luttig was born in 1954 in Tyler, Texas. He is a 1976 graduate of Washington and Lee University with a Bachelor of Arts with Omicron Delta Kappa honors. From 1976 to 1978, Luttig worked for the U.S. Supreme Court's Office of the Administrative Assistant to the Chief Justice, where he became close friends with Chief Justice Warren E. Burger. Luttig then attended the University of Virginia School of Law, graduating with a Juris Doctor degree in 1981.

== Career ==
After law school, Luttig spent a year in the Reagan administration as an associate with the White House Counsel, Fred F. Fielding, who hired him on Burger's recommendation. Luttig's duties included reviewing potential judicial appointments and vetting them for ideological consistency with the administration's policies. From 1982 to 1983, Luttig served as a law clerk to judge (later Supreme Court justice in 1986) Antonin Scalia of the U.S. Court of Appeals for the District of Columbia Circuit, one of the potential judges he had vetted in his prior job. Luttig then clerked for Chief Justice Warren Burger of the Supreme Court of the United States from 1983 to 1984. After his Supreme Court clerkship, Luttig continued to work for Chief Justice Burger as a special assistant until 1985. Luttig later served as co-executor of Burger's one-page will, which gained notoriety for Burger's failure to dictate how estate taxes should be paid.

In 1985, Luttig entered private practice at the law firm Davis Polk & Wardwell. He returned to government service in 1989, holding various positions within the United States Department of Justice until 1991 under President George H. W. Bush, including assistant attorney general in charge of the Office of Legal Counsel. His duties in the Justice Department included assisting Supreme Court nominees David Souter and Clarence Thomas through the nomination and confirmation process, including their Senate confirmation hearings. Luttig's help to Thomas in his highly contested confirmation hearings and their aftermath was somewhat controversial because Luttig's own appointment to the federal bench had been approved by the Senate, but he delayed taking the judicial oath of office, presumably because he could not credibly serve as a federal judge, who is supposed to be nonpartisan, while fulfilling the task of ensuring that Thomas got a Supreme Court seat.

=== Federal judgeship ===
On April 23, 1991, President George H. W. Bush nominated Luttig to fill a newly created seat on the United States Court of Appeals for the Fourth Circuit. He was confirmed by the United States Senate on July 26, 1991, and received his commission on August 2, 1991. He became the youngest judge (at age 37) on a federal appeals court at the time of his appointment.

On the bench, Luttig was compared to Justice Antonin Scalia for his analytical rigor and for criticizing his colleagues for inconsistencies or embellishments in their judicial opinions. He was also similar to Scalia in that his judicial philosophy sometimes led to opinions that were at odds with conservative legal orthodoxy.

Luttig was mentioned frequently as being near the top of George W. Bush's list of potential nominees to the Supreme Court of the United States despite opposition from the U.S. Chamber of Commerce and a dispute between Luttig and the Bush administration over the handling of the case of alleged "dirty bomber" Jose Padilla (see below). Bush interviewed Luttig, but ultimately did not choose him to fill either of two Supreme Court vacancies in 2005; those two seats were filled by John Roberts and Samuel Alito.

Luttig was among the leading feeder judges on the U.S. court of appeals, with more than 40 of his law clerks going on to clerk with conservative justices on the Supreme Court. Of those, 33 clerked for either Justice Thomas or Justice Scalia. Luttig's clerks have nicknamed themselves "Luttigators".

==== Father's murder ====
Luttig's father, John Luttig, was fatally shot in 1994 in a carjacking by Napoleon Beazley, who was a 17-year-old boy. Luttig testified in the sentencing portion of the trial, supporting imposition of the death penalty. Beazley was convicted, condemned to death, and eventually executed after twice appealing to the U.S. Supreme Court. Justices Antonin Scalia, David Souter, and Clarence Thomas recused themselves because of past association with Luttig. Scalia recused himself because Luttig had clerked for him; Souter and Thomas recused themselves because Luttig led the George H. W. Bush administration's efforts to win their Senate confirmation. Beazley was one of the last juvenile offenders to be executed in the United States prior to Roper v. Simmons.

==== Cases ====
===== Padilla v. Hanft =====
In September 2005, Luttig wrote the opinion for a three-judge panel of the Fourth Circuit that upheld the government's power to designate José Padilla, the alleged "dirty bomber" who was captured at a Chicago airport, as an "enemy combatant" and to detain him in a military brig without charge. In December, the Bush administration, anticipating a reversal in the Supreme Court, petitioned the Fourth Circuit for approval to transfer Padilla to civilian custody for a criminal trial. The move set off a dispute between the Bush administration and Luttig. Luttig's panel refused to grant the transfer and castigated the government for potentially harming its "credibility before the courts." The government petitioned the Supreme Court to allow the transfer by arguing that the appellate court's refusal encroached on the power of the President. The Supreme Court granted the government's request.

===== Hamdi v. Rumsfeld =====
In the case of Hamdi v. Rumsfeld, Luttig disagreed with the majority opinion of his colleagues on the Fourth Circuit and argued that Yaser Esam Hamdi, an American citizen captured in Afghanistan and held as an enemy combatant, deserved "meaningful judicial review" of his case. The Supreme Court eventually reversed the Fourth Circuit's judgment.

==== Resignation and corporate legal career ====
On May 10, 2006, Luttig resigned his federal judgeship to become general counsel and senior vice president for the American airplane manufacturer Boeing, replacing Douglas Bain. In his resignation letter, Luttig wrote, "Boeing may well be the only company in America for which I would have ever considered leaving the court." He also mentioned his two children's upcoming college education; the position at Boeing paid more than the federal judgeship. At the time of his resignation, federal appellate judges were paid US$175,100 annually. According to Boeing's 2008 Annual Report, Luttig's total compensation for 2008 was $2,798,962. In 2015, Luttig was named the 7th-highest paid general counsel in the United States by Above the Law, with a salary of $4,236,580 (~$5.61 million in 2025).

Luttig resigned as general counsel to Boeing in May 2019, and was replaced by Brett Gerry. Luttig's resignation coincided with the terminations of former CEO Dennis Muilenburg and former Commercial Aircraft Executive Kevin McCallister that year, during the Boeing 737 MAX groundings crisis. In January 2021, he was hired by Coca-Cola Company to be counselor and senior advisor for tax matters.

=== Role in aftermath of 2020 presidential election ===
On January 5, 2021, John Eastman, an attorney representing president Donald Trump, and who had clerked for Luttig, met with vice president Mike Pence in the Oval Office to argue that the vice president had the constitutional authority to alter or otherwise change certified electoral votes for the presidential certification in Congress the next day. According to Eastman, he told the vice president that he might have the authority to reject electoral college votes, and he asked the vice president to delay the certification, a proposal which came to be known as the Pence Card. Pence rejected Eastman's argument and instead agreed with Luttig and another conservative scholar, John Yoo, that a vice president has no such constitutional authority. Pence released a letter on January 6 stating he would not attempt to intervene in the certification process, citing Luttig by name, who later said it was "the highest honor of my life" to be involved in preserving the Constitution.

A week later, as preparations were beginning for Donald Trump's second impeachment following the January 6 United States Capitol attack, Luttig argued in a Washington Post op-ed piece that the Constitution did not provide for the impeachment of former presidents. Senate Minority Leader Mitch McConnell later made the same argument while explaining his vote to acquit.

Luttig at the third public hearing of the House Select Committee on the January 6 Attack on June 16, 2022.

The following year, on June 16, 2022, Luttig testified during a televised hearing conducted by the United States House Select Committee on the January 6 Attack. Before the hearing, Luttig wrote a statement for the record, stating that Trump and his allies "instigated" a war on democracy "so that he could cling to power." He continued, "It is breathtaking that these arguments even were conceived, let alone entertained by the President of the United States at that perilous moment in history" and that January 6 "was the final fateful day for the execution of a well-developed plan by the former president to overturn the 2020 presidential election at any cost." At the close of the hearing, Luttig said:

Donald Trump and his allies and supporters are a clear and present danger to American democracy. They would attempt to overturn that 2024 election in the same way that they attempted to overturn the 2020 election, but succeed in 2024 where they failed in 2020. I don't speak those words lightly. I would have never spoken those words ever in my life, except that that's what the former president and his allies are telling us.

Luttig co-authored a 69-page report refuting claims of fraud in the 2020 election, published in July 2022.

On August 19, 2023, Luttig and liberal legal scholar Laurence Tribe, published an article that argued that Trump is barred from presidential office pursuant to the Insurrection Clause (section 3 of the 14th Amendment) because of his apparent support for the January 6 United States Capitol attack and, regardless of the riot, "no person who sought to overthrow our Constitution and thereafter declared that it should be 'terminated' and that he be immediately returned to the presidency can in good faith take the oath that Article II, Section 1 demands of any president-elect." This view has been furthered by other legal scholars. Luttig makes the point that

[Groups that filed lawsuits to bar Trump from the ballot] do not yet understand what disqualifies the former president, namely an insurrection or rebellion against the constitution. They have argued the cases as if he is disqualified because he engaged in insurrection or rebellion against the United States. That's why they have, unfortunately, focused their efforts on establishing or not that the former president was responsible for the riot on the Capitol. The riot on the Capitol is incidental to the question of whether he engaged in a rebellion against the constitution."

In November 2023, with Donald Trump leading the race for the Republican presidential nomination, Luttig said "I am more worried for America today than I was on January 6. For all the reasons that we know, his election would be catastrophic for America's democracy." Luttig followed up with an essay in The New York Times describing a possible way that lawyers can improve the political landscape.

On July 1, 2024, Luttig was interviewed on MSNBC regarding the Supreme Court's ruling in Trump v. United States (2024), which granted Trump and other presidents immunity from prosecution for crimes committed in their official capacity as president. Luttig stated that "There is no support whatsoever in the Constitution or even in the Supreme Court's precedents, for the past 200 years, for this reprehensible decision by the Supreme Court. Needless to say, the decision is irreconcilable with America's democracy, the Constitution, and the rule of law." He stated that "America's democracy and the rule of law are this country's heart and soul. Our democracy and the rule of law are what have made America the envy of the world and the beacon of freedom to the world for almost 250 years. Now, today, the Supreme Court cut that heart and soul out of America."

In August 2024, he endorsed Kamala Harris in the 2024 presidential election, writing, "In the presidential election of 2024 there is only one political party and one candidate for the presidency that can claim the mantle of defender and protector of America’s Democracy, the Constitution, and the Rule of Law. As a result, I will unhesitatingly vote for the Democratic Party’s candidate for the Presidency of the United States, Vice President of the United States, Kamala Harris." He added "In voting for Vice President Harris, I assume that her public policy views are vastly different from my own, but I am indifferent in this election as to her policy views on any issues other than America’s Democracy, the Constitution, and the Rule of Law, as I believe all Americans should be.

=== Since the second Trump administration ===
In August 2025, Luttig criticized Chief Justice John Roberts and the Supreme Court’s handling of emergency rulings involving the Trump administration. He stated that Roberts was "presiding over the end of the rule of law in America," and argued the Court was "acquiescing in and accommodating the president’s lawlessness … without briefing, without argument, without deliberation – and without even a single word of explanation of its decisions." Luttig characterized this as "a fundamental distortion of the American legal system" and said Roberts "knows exactly what he is doing." Luttig has known Roberts for over four decades and served as a groomsman at his wedding.

In December 2025 Luttig pointed out that Trump was "fully enabled to undermine national elections" and that he was "clearly willing to subvert an election in order to hold on to the power".

Luttig is among the leaders of an organization of retired federal judges who are filing amicus briefs in court cases against Trump policies. On June 27, 2026, Sidney Blumenthal and Sean Wilentz interviewed Luttig on a Substack broadcast of the Legal AF "The Court of History" regarding the organization and its filings regarding a proposed monetary fund from taxpayers dollars for the president and certain allies and the proposal of exemption from investigation for tax evasions for the president, members of his family, and certain allies. The interview was continued in another segment with discussion of the historical importance of current circumstances as a test to the constitution and the rule of law.

== See also ==
- List of law clerks for the chief justice of the United States
- George W. Bush Supreme Court candidates

Legal offices
New seat	Judge of the United States Court of Appeals for the Fourth Circuit; 1991–2006	Succeeded by G. Steven Agee
