= ConSource =

American non-profit organization

The Constitutional Sources Project (ConSource) is a non-profit organization that provides source documents on the history of the United States Constitution to researchers.

== About ==
The Constitutional Sources Project is a 501(c)(3) non-profit organization, based in Washington D.C., that creates "a comprehensive, easily searchable, fully-indexed, and freely accessible digital library of historical sources related to the creation, ratification, and amendment of the United States Constitution." It hosts public educational programs, professional development workshops for educators, and provides additional research and educational services to the public.

== History ==
The Constitutional Sources Project was founded in 2005 and its website launched in 2007 under the leadership of Lorianne Updike Toler. Julie Silverbrook serves as the organization's executive director. ConSource was created to provide free digital access to the documentary history of the United States Constitution.

== Programming ==
Educational Programming

PrimarySource Education Campaign The purpose of ConSource's PrimarySource campaign is to transform traditional classrooms into vibrant, resource-rich classrooms, where students can access and learn directly from primary source documents. ConSource assists educators as they cultivate the next generation of historical thinkers by providing free online access to the documentary history of the creation, ratification, and amendment of the United States Constitution.

ConSource provides professional development workshops for educators at its headquarters in Washington, D.C., and in school districts and civic sites nationwide. ConSource also offers a one-to-one lesson plan consulting service, with education staff members providing direct guidance and suggested primary source materials to educators teaching important moments in U.S. history.

ConSource education staff members also produce and distribute to teachers nationwide primary source-focused lesson plans on constitutional and historical topics.

ConSource-Harlan Institute Virtual Supreme Court Competition During the October 2012 Supreme Court term, the Harlan Institute and ConSource launched the Virtual Supreme Court Competition. By participating in this competition, high school students gain experience in researching contemporary constitutional issues, crafting persuasive appellate briefs on their classroom blogs, and presenting convincing oral arguments to legal experts in a virtual courtroom over Google+ Video Hangouts.

The Virtual Supreme Court Competition takes place in two stages: submission of an appellate brief and presentation of oral argument. The grand prize for the top two high school students is an all-expense-paid trip to Washington, D.C., to attend ConSource's Annual Constitution Day Celebration.

Legal Programming

SCOTUSource Through the SCOTUSource project at Harvard Law School, ConSource aims to guide law students through the process of historical constitutional research. SCOTUSource participants produce research reports related to pending U.S. Supreme Court cases, which are then shared with appellate advocates, scholars, journalists, legal organizations. In past semesters, Harvard Law Students have created historical research reports on constitutional issues in the following U.S. Supreme Court cases, Kiyemba v. Obama, Beer v. United States, PPL Montana, LLC v. Montana, NFIB v. Sebelius, Shelby County v. Holder, and NLRB v. Noel Canning.
