= E. Barrett Prettyman Jr. =

American lawyer (1925–2016)

Elijah Barrett Prettyman Jr. (June 1, 1925 – November 4, 2016) was an American lawyer.

== Early life and education ==
Prettyman was born in Washington, D.C. His father was United States federal judge E. Barrett Prettyman.

Prettyman graduated from St. Albans School in Washington, D.C. He then served in the United States Army in Europe during World War II. In 1949, he graduated from Yale University. He then worked as a journalist for two years in Rhode Island. In 1953, he received a law degree from the University of Virginia Law School.

== Career ==
Prettyman served as law clerk to United States Supreme Court justices Robert H. Jackson, Felix Frankfurter, and John Marshall Harlan II. He then practiced law in Washington, D.C. In 1962, he negotiated an agreement with Fidel Castro to secure the release of prisoners involved in the Bay of Pigs invasion. He served as special counsel to the United States House of Representatives Ethics Committee in the 1980s involving the Abscam investigation.

== Death ==
Prettyman died in a hospital in Washington, D.C. from a respiratory ailment. He is buried at Rockville Cemetery in Rockville, Maryland.

== See also ==
- List of law clerks for the second seat of the Supreme Court of the United States
- List of law clerks for the ninth seat of the Supreme Court of the United States
