= List of first minority male lawyers and judges in California =

This is a list of the first minority male lawyer(s) and judge(s) in California. It includes the year in which the men were admitted to practice law (in parentheses). Also included are other distinctions such as the first minority men in their state to graduate from law school or become a political figure.

== Firsts in state history ==
=== Law school ===
- You Chung Hong (1923): First Chinese American male law graduate in California (1925)

=== Lawyers ===
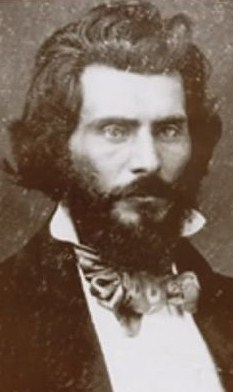
John Rollin Ridge: First Native American (Cherokee) male lawyer in California (c. 1840s)

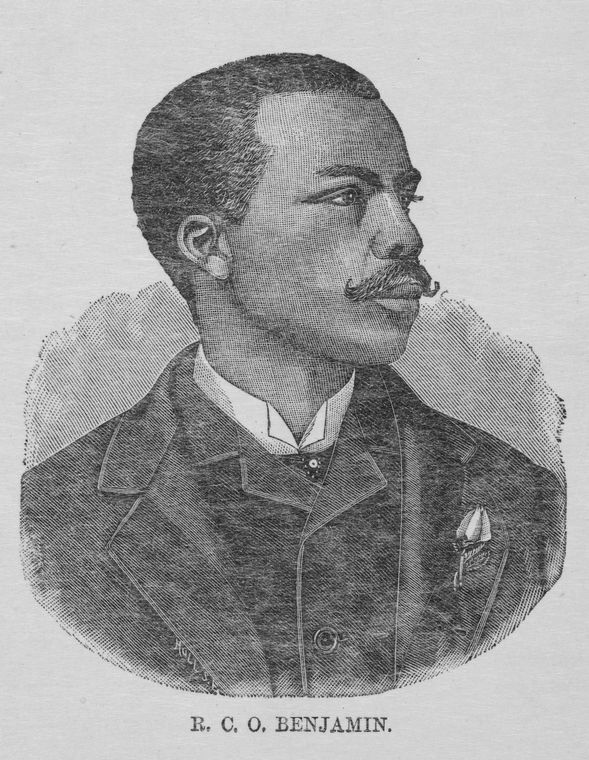
R.C.O. Benjamin: First African American male lawyer in California (1884)

- John Rollin Ridge (Yellow Bird) (c. 1840s): First Native American (Cherokee) lawyer in California
- R.C.O. Benjamin (1884): First African American male lawyer in California
- Hong Yen Chang (1888): First Chinese American male lawyer in the U.S., but was denied the right to practice law in California
- Gustavus Woodson Wickliffe (1894): First African American to passed the bar exam in Southern California and first to be admitted to practice in the State of California courts
- Washington J. Oglesby (1896, 1902): First African American male to pass the California State Bar exam in 1896, but was refused bar admittance until 1902
- Theodore Grady (1897): First deaf male lawyer in California
- Charles S. Darden (1906): First African American male lawyer to argue a case before the Supreme Court of California (c. 1920s)
- Ponciano Reyes (1907) and Carlos Basa (1917): First Filipino males admitted to the State Bar of California
- Oscar Hudson (1911): First African American male admitted to the State Bar of California
- Chan Chung Wing (1918): First Chinese American male lawyer to pass the California Bar exam
- Kenji Ito (1945): First Japanese American male lawyer post-WWII in California
- Manoucher Farzan (1954): First Persian American male lawyer in California
- Charles H. Matthews, Sr. (1930): First African American male lawyer to serve on the California State Law Revision Commission (1956)
- Cruz Reynoso (1959): First Latino American male admitted to the State Bar of California
- Paul C. Lo (1994): First Hmong American male admitted to the State Bar of California
- Sergio C. Garcia (2014): First undocumented immigrant male admitted to the State Bar of California

=== Judicial officers ===
==== State ====
===== Justice of the Peace =====
- Charles S. Darden (1906): First African American male to seek a judgeship in California (he was nominated for the police court in 1906, though he would withdraw from the nomination).
- Oscar Overr: First African American to serve as a Justice of the Peace in California (1914)

===== Judges =====
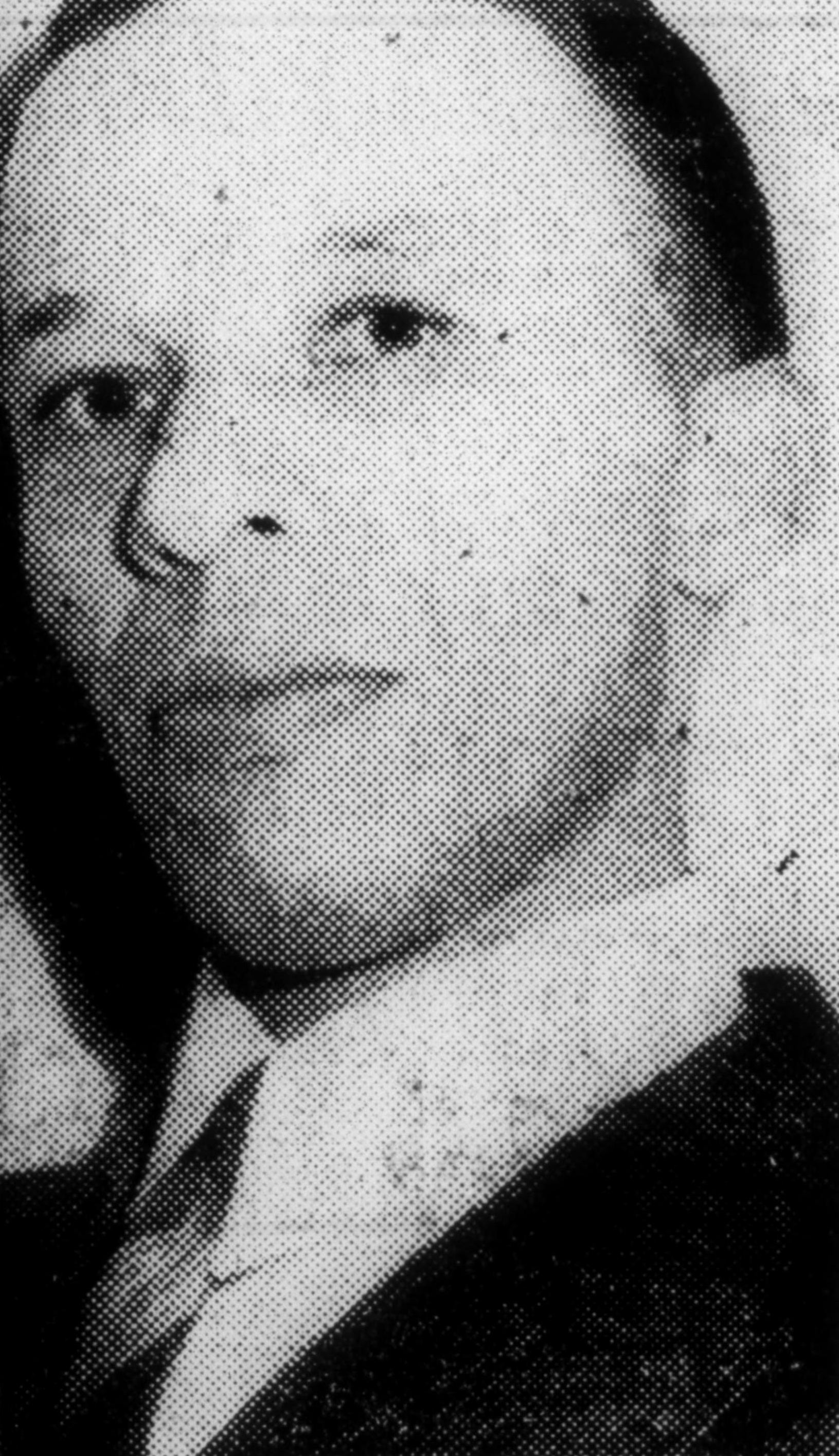
Edwin L. Jefferson: First African American male judge in California (1941)

- Henry A. Lyons: First Jewish American judge in California (upon his appointment to the California Supreme Court in 1849)
- Edwin L. Jefferson (1931): First African American male judge in California (1941)
- Carlos Teran: First Mexican American male to serve as a Judge of the Superior Court in California (1959)
- Leopoldo Sanchez: First Mexican American male elected as a judge in California (1960)
- Ralph Moradian (1934): First male of Armenian descent to become a judge in California (1963)
- David W. Williams (1937): He was considered "the first African-American federal judge west of the Mississippi." (1969)
- John Aiso (1941): First Japanese American male judge in California (1952)
- Delbert E. Wong (1948): First Chinese American male judge in California (1959)
- Fred W. Gabourie (1965): First Native American (Seneca people) male judge in California (1976)
- Stephen Lachs (1963): First openly LGBT male judge in California (1979)
- Kenneth Chang (1963): First Korean American male judge in California (1980)
- Mel Red Recana (1974): First Filipino American male judge in California (1981)
- Thang Nguyen Barrett (1988): First Vietnamese American male judge in California (1997)
- James A. Kaddo: First Lebanese-born male judge in California (1998)
- Paul C. Lo (1994): First Hmong American male judge in California (2013)
- Firdaus Dordi (1996): First Zoroastrian male judge in California (2017)
- Halim Dhanidina (1997): First Muslim American male judge in California (2012)
- Aruna P. Rodrigo (2008): First Sri Lankan American male judge in California (2021)
- Raj Singh Badesha: First turbaned Sikh male judge in California (2024)

===== Appellate Court =====
- Cruz Reynoso (1959): First Latino American male appointed to the California Court of Appeal (1976)
- Stephen K. Tamura: First Japanese American male appointed as a Judge of the Court of Appeal in California (1966)
- Rosendo Peña (1980): First Latino American male appointed as a Judge of the Fifth District Court of Appeals in California (2012)
- Jim Humes (c. 1983): First openly LGBT male appointed as a Judge of the California Court of Appeals (2012)
- Richard T. Fields (1983): First African American male appointed as a Judge of the Fourth District Court of Appeals in California (2016)
- Luis A. Lavin (1985): First openly LGBT male appointed as a Judge of the Second District Court of Appeals in California (2015)
- M. Bruce Smith (1988): First African American male appointed as a Judge of the Fifth District Court of Appeals in California (2014)
- Miguel Márquez (1996): First Latino American male appointed as a Judge of the Sixth District Court of Appeals in California (2012)
- Gabriel P. Sanchez: First Latino American male appointed as a Judge of the First District Court of Appeals in California (2018)
- Maurice Sanchez: First Latino American male appointed as a Judge of the Third District Court of Appeal in California (2022)

===== Supreme Court =====
- Henry A. Lyons: First Jewish American male to serve as a Justice (1849) and Chief Justice (1852) of the California Supreme Court
- Solomon Heydenfeldt: First Jewish American male elected as a Justice of the California Supreme Court (1852)
- Wiley Manuel (1954): First African American male appointed as a Justice of the California Supreme Court (1977)
- Cruz Reynoso (1959): First Latino American male appointed as a Justice of the California Supreme Court (1981)
- Martin Jenkins (1981): First openly LGBT (African-American) male appointed as a Justice of the California Supreme Court (2020)

==== Federal ====
===== District Court =====
- Manuel Real: First Latino American male appointed as a Judge of the U.S. District Court for the Central District of California (1966)
- Earl Ben Gilliam (1957): First African American male appointed as a Judge of the U.S. District Court for the Southern District of California (1980)
- Robert Aguilar (1958): First Latino American male appointed as a Judge of the U.S. District Court for the Northern District of California (1980)
- Raul Anthony Ramirez: First Latino American male appointed as a Judge of the U.S. District Court for the Eastern District of California (1980)
- Dickran Tevrizian (1965): First male of Armenian descent to become a Judge of the U.S. District Court for the Central District of California (1985)
- Ronald S. W. Lew (1971): First Chinese American male appointed as a Judge of the U.S. District Court for the Central District of California (1987)
- Thelton Henderson (1962): First African American male appointed as the Chief Judge of the U.S. District Court for the Northern District of California (1990)
- Garland Ellis Burrell Jr. (1976): First African American male appointed as a Judge of the U.S. District Court for the Eastern District of California (1991)
- Robert Mitsuhiro Takasugi: First Japanese American male to serve as Judge of the U.S. District Court for the Central District of California (1996)
- Edward M. Chen (1980): First Asian American male appointed as a Judge of the U.S. District Court for the Northern District of California (2011)
- Michael W. Fitzgerald (1985): First openly LGBT male appointed as a Judge of the U.S. District Court for the Central District of California (2012)
- Vijay Gandhi (1997): First Indian American male judge appointed as a Judge of the U.S. District Court for the Central District of California (2010)
- Vince Chhabria (1998): First Indian American male appointed as a Judge of the U.S. District Court for the Northern District of California (2014)
- Steve B. Chu: First Asian American male to serve as a U.S. Magistrate Judge of the U.S. District Court for the Southern District of California (2023)
- P. Casey Pitts: First openly gay male to serve as a Judge of the United States District Court for the Northern District of California (2023)
- Daniel Calabretta: First openly gay male to serve as a Judge of the United States District Court for the Eastern District of California (2023)

===== Bankruptcy Court =====
- Robert Kwan: First male of Chinese ancestry to serve as a Judge of the United States Bankruptcy Court for the Central District of California (2007)

===== Circuit Court =====
- Arthur Alarcón: First Latino American male appointed as a Judge of the U.S. Court of Appeals for the Ninth Circuit in California (1979)

=== Federal Public Defender ===
- Cuauhtemoc Ortega: First Latino and openly gay male to serve as the Federal Public Defender for the Central District of California (c. 2018)

=== Attorney General ===
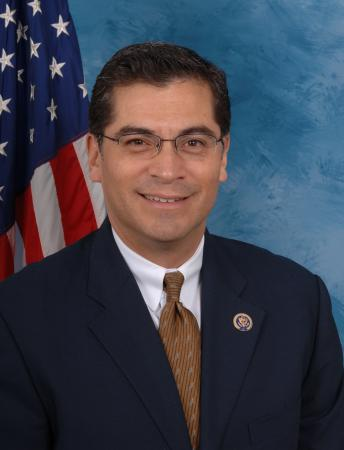
Xavier Becerra: First Latino American male Attorney General for California (2017)

- Stanley Mosk: First Jewish American male appointed as the Attorney General of California (1959)
- Xavier Becerra (1985): First Latino American male appointed as the Attorney General of California (2017)
- Rob Bonta (1999): First Filipino American male appointed as the Attorney General of California (2021)

=== Deputy Attorney General ===
- Delbert E. Wong (1948): First Chinese American male appointed as a Deputy Attorney General in California (1952)

=== Assistant Attorney General ===
- Franklin Williams: First African American male to serve as the Assistant Attorney General of California (1959)

=== United States Attorney ===
- Cecil F. Poole (1939): First African American male to serve as the U.S. Attorney for the Northern District of California (1961)
- André Birotte Jr. (1991): First African American male U.S. Attorney for the Central District (2010). He would later become a district court judge.

=== District Attorney ===
- Christopher W. Smith (1959): First African American male to serve as a District Attorney in California (1977-1981)

=== City Attorney ===
- Mikio Uchiyama (1953): First Japanese American male to serve as a City Attorney in California

=== Political office ===
- Charles Calderon (1976): First Hispanic American male lawyer to become a Senate Majority Leader in California (1996)

=== Associations ===
- Allen Broussard (1954): First African American male judge to serve as the President of the California Judges Association (1972)
- Samuel L. Williams: First African American male to serve as the President of the State Bar of California (1981)
- Rudy Diaz: First Latino American male to serve as President of the California Judges Association (1991)
- Luis Rodriguez: First Latino American male to serve as the President of the State Bar of California (2013)
- Michael Colantuono: First openly LGBT male to serve as the President of the State Bar of California (2017)
- Jason Lee: First Chinese American male to serve as the President of the State Bar of California (2018)
- Ronald E. Albers: First openly LGBT male to serve as the Vice-President of the State Bar of California

== Firsts in local history ==
Alphabetized by county name

=== Region ===
- Lewis A. Franklin (1853): First Jewish male lawyer in Southern California (c. 1850s) (specifically San Diego, California)
- Wayne M. Kanemoto (1943): First Japanese American male judge in Northern California (Santa Clara County, California; 1962)
- Mikio Uchiyama (1953): First Japanese American male judge in Central California (Fresno County, California; 1968)
- Cecil F. Poole (1939): First African American male to serve as a federal judge in Northern California (1976)
- Edward M. Chen (1980): First Asian American male federal district court judge in Northern California's history
- Phan-Quang Tue and Alberto Gonzalez: First Asian and Latino male judges respectively to serve in Northern California's Executive Office for Immigration Review (1995)
- Sunil Kulkarni (1996): First South Asian American male judge in Northern California (2013)

=== Alameda County ===
- James Wilson: First African American male to apply for admittance to the Alameda County Bar Association. He was denied entry.
- Washington J. Oglesby: Admitted to practice in 1896, he is one of the first African American attorneys to practice law in the City of Oakland, Alameda County, California.
- Motoyuki Negoro: First Japanese male to graduate with a degree from the UC Berkeley School of Law (1907). He was unable to practice law due to being a resident alien.
- Lawrence Sledge (1908): An early African American male lawyer who practiced law in the City of Oakland, Alameda County, California, around 1908.
- Walter Gordon: First African American male law graduate from the University of California, Berkeley (1922) [Alameda County, California]
- Lionel Wilson (1950): First African American male judge in Alameda County, California (1960)
- Carl Metoyer (1953): First African American male to serve as the President of the Alameda County Bar Association (1970)
- Ming Chin (1967): First Asian American male to serve as the President of the Alameda County Bar Association (c. 1987)
- Ken M. Kawaichi: First Asian American male judge in Alameda County, California (1980)
- Carlos Ynostroza (1969): First Latino American male judge in Alameda County, California (1980)
- Keith H. Fudenna (1974): First Asian American male appointed as a Judge of the Municipal Court to the Fremont-Newark-Union City Municipal Court (Alameda County, California; 1997)
- Tom Reardon: First openly LGBT male to serve as a Judge of the Alameda County Superior Court (c. 1998)
- Brendon Woods: First African American male to serve as the Public Defender of Alameda County (2012)
- Somnath Raj Chatterjee (1995): First South Asian male appointed as a Judge of the Alameda County Superior Court (2017)
- John Oda: First Asian American male to serve as a Judge of the Albany-Berkeley Municipal Court, Alameda County, California (1986)
- Donald P. McCullum: First African American male to serve as the Berkeley City Attorney, Alameda County, California

=== Alpine County ===
- Christopher W. Smith (1959): First African American male to serve as a District Attorney in Alpine County, California (1977-1981)

=== Butte County ===
- Jesus A. Rodriguez: First Latino American male judge in Butte County, California (2018)

=== Contra Costa County ===
- George Washington Young: First African American male lawyer to practice before a Contra Costa County court (1907)
- Henry Alvarado (1896): First Hispanic American male judge in Contra Costa County, California (1923)
- George Carroll (1954): First African American male lawyer in Richmond, California. He would later become the first African American male judge in Contra Costa County, California (1965).
- Christopher W. Bowen: First openly LGBT male appointed as a Judge of Contra Costa County Superior Court (2010)
- Benjamin T. Reyes III (1993): First Filipino American male appointed as a Judge of Contra Costa County Superior Court (2017)

=== Fresno County ===
- Hugh W. Goodwin (1949): First African American male lawyer (c. 1950s) and judge in Fresno County, California (1976)
- Tom Okawara: First Japanese American male lawyer in Fresno County, California
- Armando Rodriguez (1965): First Latino American male judge in Fresno County, California (1975)
- Simon Marootian: First male of Armenian descent to become a Judge of the Superior Court of Fresno County (1975)
- Mikio Uchiyama (1953): First Japanese American male judge in Fresno County, California. He was also the first Japanese American male to become the City Attorney for Fowler, California.
- Raj Singh Badesha: First turbaned Sikh male judge in Fresno County, California (2024)

=== Imperial County ===
- Cruz Reynoso (1959): First Latino American male lawyer to register with the Imperial County Bar Association
- Matias R. Contreras: First Latino American male judge in Imperial County, California (upon his appointment to the municipal court in 1980)
- Marco D. Nunez (2002): First openly LGBT male judge in Imperial County, California (2016)

=== Kern County ===
- Gregory A. Pulskamp: First Muslim male appointed as a Judge of the Kern County Superior Court, California (2018)
- James A. Yoro: First Filipino male attorney to practice in Kern County, California (1979)
- Navraj Rai: First Sikh male judge in Kern County, California (2026)

=== Kings County ===
- Lawrence Sledge (1908): First African American male lawyer to practice before a Kings County court (1909)
- Thomas DeSantos: First Hispanic American male to serve as a Judge of the Kings County Superior Court (2003)

=== Los Angeles County ===
- Manuel Clemente Rojo: First Latino (Peruvian-born) lawyer in Los Angeles County, California (1848)
- Agustín Olvera: First (Mexican) male to serve as a Judge of the Court of Sessions for the newly-formed Los Angeles County (1850)
- Francisco P. Ramirez (1869): First Mexican American male lawyer in Los Angeles County, California
- Ygnacio Sepúlveda: First (Mexican-born) male to serve as a Judge of the Superior Court of Los Angeles County (1879)
- R. C. O. Benjamin (1884): First African American male lawyer in Los Angeles, California
- Clarence B. Thomas: First African American male to graduate from USC Gould School of Law (1904) [Los Angeles County, California]
- Sei Fujii: First Japanese-born male to graduate from USC Gould School of Law (1911) [Los Angeles County, California]
- James M. Alexander: First African American male to matriculate at the University of Southern California (1915) [Los Angeles County, California]
- You Chung Hong (1923): First Chinese American male law graduate from the University of Southern California (1925) [Los Angeles County, California]
- Leon Whitaker (1928): First African American male to serve as the Deputy District Attorney for Los Angeles County, California (c. 1930s)
- Alfred Paonessa: First Italian American male judge in Los Angeles County (upon his appointment to the Los Angeles Municipal Court in 1931)
- Thomas L. Griffith (1931): First African American male lawyer admitted to the Los Angeles Bar Association (1950). He became the first African American male appointed as a municipal court judge (1953), Presiding Judge of the Los Angeles Municipal Court (1962), and elected as a Judge of the Los Angeles Superior Court (1969).
- John Aiso (1941): First Japanese American male judge in Los Angeles County, California (1952)
- Delbert E. Wong (1948): First Chinese American male judge Los Angeles County, California (1959)
- Carlos Teran: First Mexican American male to serve as a Judge of the Superior Court in Los Angeles County, California (1959). He was also the first Mexican American male appointed as a municipal court judge in East Los Angeles (1957).
- Leopoldo Sanchez: First Mexican American male elected as a municipal court judge in Los Angeles County, California (1960)
- Marcus O. Tucker (1962): First African American male to serve as a Judge of the Long Beach Municipal Court (1976)
- Fred W. Gabourie (1965): First Native American (Seneca people) male judge in Los Angeles County, California (1976)
- Samuel L. Williams: First African American male to serve as the President of the Los Angeles County Bar Association (1977)
- Johnnie Cochran (1963): First African American male to serve as the Assistant District Attorney in Los Angeles County, California (1978)
- Stephen Lachs (1963): First openly gay male judge in Los Angeles County, California (1979)
- Mel Red Recana (1974): First Filipino American male judge in Los Angeles County, California (1981)
- Richard Paez (1972): First Mexican American male to serve as a federal judge in Los Angeles (1994)
- Rocky Delgadillo: First Latino American male to serve as the City Attorney for Los Angeles (2001)
- Rand Schrader: First openly gay male lawyer to work for the Los Angeles City Attorney's Office
- D. Zeke Zeidler: First openly gay male elected as a Judge of the Superior Court of Los Angeles (2004)
- Eric Webber: First openly gay male to serve as the President of the Los Angeles County Bar Association (c. 2013)
- Firdaus Dordi: First Zoroastrian male judge in Los Angeles County, California (2017)
- Ricardo García: First Latino American male to serve as the Public Defender for Los Angeles County, California (2018)
- Kevin Brazile (1984): First African American male to serve as the Presiding Judge of the Los Angeles County Superior Court (2019)
- Sergio C. Tapia III: First Latino American male to serve as the Presiding Judge of the Los Angeles County Superior Court (2025)
- Ricardo Ocampo: First Asian American male to serve as the Assistant Presiding Judge of the Los Angeles County Superior Court (2025)
- John W. Patton, Jr.: First African American male to serve as the President of the Beverly Hills Bar Association, Los Angeles County (1997)
- Roy Jimenez: First Latino American male to serve as the Co-President of the LGBT Bar Association of Los Angeles
- Robert B. Lopez: First Mexican American male to serve as a Judge of the Alhambra Municipal Court, Los Angeles County, California (1974)

=== Marin County ===
- William Haynes Stephens (1967): First African American male lawyer in Marin County, California
- William H. Stephens (1967): First African American male judge in Marin County, California (c. 1979-1999)
- Mark Andrew Talamantes (1997): First Latino American male judge in Marin County, California (2012)
- Jose Varela: First Latino American male appointed as the Public Defender for Marin County, California

=== Merced County ===
- Paul C. Lo (1994): First Hmong American male judge in Merced County, California (2013)
- Marc A. Garcia (1995): First Latino American male judge in Merced County, California (2007)

=== Monterey County ===
- Albert Maldonado (1974): First Latino American male appointed as a judge in Monterey County, California (1995)
- Jose Angel Velasquez: First Latino American male elected as a judge in Monterey County, California (1995)
- Efren N. Iglesia: First Filipino American male judge in Monterey County, California (2007). He was also considered the first Filipino male judge in the tri-county area of Santa Cruz, Santa Clara, and San Benito Counties.

=== Orange County ===
- James O. Perez (1956): First Latino American male lawyer and judge in Orange County, California
- Stephen K. Tamura: First Japanese American (and Asian American in general) male lawyer, county counsel and Superior Court Judge in Orange County, California.
- John Nho Trong Nguyen: First Vietnamese American male to serve as a Judge of the Superior Court of Orange County (2000)
- Mena Guirguis: First Arab American male to serve as a Judge of the Superior Court of Orange County (2024)
- Bryan Clavecilla: First Filipino American male to serve as a Judge of the Orange County Superior Court (2024)
- Frank Ospino: First Hispanic American male to serve as the Public Defender for Orange County, California

=== Placer County ===
- George Yonehiro: First Japanese American male judge in Placer County, California (1964)
- Michael W. Jones: First Latino American male appointed as a Judge of the Placer County Superior Court, California (2012)
- Garen J. Horst: First Jewish American male appointed as a Judge of the Placer County Superior Court, California (2012)
- Todd D. Irby: First African American male appointed as a Judge of the Placer County Superior Court, California (2018)

=== Riverside County ===
- Richard Fields: First African American male judge in Riverside County, California (2000)
- Jack Lucky: First Asian American male (who is of Korean descent) judge in Riverside County, California (2008)
- Godofredo (O.G.) Magno: First Filipino American male appointed as a Judge of the Riverside County Superior Court, California (2017)

=== Sacramento County ===
- Nathaniel Colley (1948): First African American male lawyer in Sacramento, Sacramento County, California
- Alfonso Gonzalez (1962): First Mexican American male lawyer in Sacramento, Sacramento County, California
- Mamoru Sakuma (1950): First Asian American male (Japanese American) judge in Sacramento County, California (1963)
- Gary E. Ransom (1974): First African American male to work as an Assistant Public Defender for Sacramento County's Public Defender's Office (1974)
- Lorenzo Patino: First Latino American male to serve as a municipal court judge in Sacramento County, California
- Joginder Dhillon: First Sikh male appointed as a Judge of the Superior Court of Sacramento (2018)
- Daniel J. Calabretta: First openly LGBT male appointed as a Judge of the Superior Court of Sacramento (2019)
- Thien Ho: First Asian American male (of Vietnamese descent) to serve as the District Attorney for Sacramento County (2022)

=== San Benito County ===
- Alfredo A. Garcia: First Hispanic American male judge in San Benito County, California
- Efren N. Iglesia: First Filipino American male judge appointed in the tri-county area of Santa Cruz, Santa Clara, and San Benito Counties. He served on the bench, however, in Monterey County, California.

=== San Bernardino County ===
- Jesse Arias: First Latino American male lawyer in San Bernardino, San Bernardino County, California
- Michael A. Ramos: First Hispanic American male to serve as the District Attorney for San Bernardino County, California (2002)
- Winston S. Keh: First Filipino American male appointed as a Judge of the San Bernardino County Superior Court, California (2017)
- Aruna P. Rodrigo (2008): First Sri Lankan American male appointed as a Judge of the San Bernardino County Superior Court, California (2021)

=== San Diego County ===
- Joseph H. Stuart: First African American male lawyer in San Diego County, California (1890)
- Duane E. Bennett: First African American male to become the City Attorney for Oceanside, San Diego County, California
- Ataulfo “A.F.” Molina (1923): First Latino American male judge in San Diego County, California (1941)
- Earl Ben Gilliam (1957): First African American male judge in San Diego County, California (1963)
- James D. Floyd (1968): First African American male to graduate from the University of San Diego School of Law (1966)
- Ernest Borunda: First Hispanic American male judge in the South Bay judicial district in San Diego County (1979)
- Fred W. Alvarez: First Latino American male to serve as the President of the Bar Association of San Francisco (2000)
- Jesus "Jesse" Rodriguez: First Hispanic American male to serve as the Assistant District Attorney for San Diego County, California (2003)
- Ted Weathers: First openly LGBT male judge in San Diego County, California (2003)
- Dwain Woodley: First African American male to serve as the Assistant District Attorney for San Diego County, California (2021)
- Erik Weber (2012): First male with autism to graduate from the Cal Western School of Law and pass the California Bar Exam [San Diego County, California]
- CJ Mody: First South Asian male judge in San Diego County, California (2021)

=== San Francisco County ===
- R. C. O. Benjamin (1884): First African American male lawyer admitted to the San Francisco Bar Association (1887)
- Thomas Pearson: First African American male lawyer to practice in the U.S. District Court in San Francisco, California (1905)
- Chan Chung Wing (1918): First Chinese American male lawyer in San Francisco, California
- Harold Dobbs (1942): First Jewish male graduate of UC Hastings College of the Law. He would later found his own law firm and become co-founder of Mel's Drive-In. [San Francisco County, California]
- William Jack Chow (1935): First Chinese American male to serve as a Deputy District Attorney in San Francisco County, California (1942)
- Cecil F. Poole (1939): First African American male to serve as the Deputy District Attorney for San Francisco County, California (1949)
- John W. Bussey (1931): First African American male judge in San Francisco County, California (1958)
- Frederick D. Smith: First African American male to serve as a Public Defender in San Francisco County, California (1961)
- Harry Low (1955): First Asian American male judge in San Francisco County, California (1966)
- Herb Donaldson (1957): First openly LGBT male judge in San Francisco County, California (1983)
- Ronald Quidachy: First Filipino American male judge in San Francisco County, California (1983)
- David Smith Fox: First openly LGBT male to serve as the Deputy City Attorney in San Francisco County, California (1985)
- Luis Garcia: First Latino American male judge in San Francisco County, California
- Everett Hewlett: First African American male to serve as a Commissioner of the San Francisco Superior Court (1986)
- Michael G.W. Lee: First Asian American male to serve as the President of the San Francisco Bar Association (1990)
- Raymond Marshall: First African American male to serve as the President of the San Francisco Bar Association (1993)
- Dennis Herrera: First Latino American male to serve as the San Francisco City Attorney (2001)
- Jeff Adachi (1985): First Asian American male to serve as the San Francisco Public Defender (2003)
- Frank H. Wu: First Asian American male to serve as the Dean of University of California, Hastings College of the Law (2010)
- George Gascón: First Latino American male District Attorney of San Francisco County, California (2011)
- Roger Chan: First openly LGBT and Korean American male to serve as a Judge of the San Francisco Superior Court, California (2016)
- Alex Bastian: First Armenian American male prosecutor in San Francisco
- David Chiu: First Asian American male to serve as the San Francisco City Attorney (2021)

=== San Joaquin County ===
- Charles A. James (1954): First African American male lawyer to open a law office in Stockton, San Joaquin County, California
- Cruz F. Portillo (1956): First Hispanic American male to graduate and become a lawyer from the Humphrey College of Law [San Joaquin County, California]
- John F. Cruikshank Jr. (1963): First African American male judge (1979) in San Joaquin County, California
- Ralph Cingcon: First African American male to serve as the Assistant District Attorney for Stockton, California (1980; San Joaquin County, California)
- Frank Kim: First Asian American male to serve as the Deputy District Attorney and a judge (1971) in San Joaquin County, California
- Jose L. Alva: First Latino American male to serve as a Judge of the San Joaquin County Superior Court (2006)

=== San Luis Obispo County ===
- Jose Mariano Bonilla: First (Mexican-born) county judge in San Luis Obispo County, California (1850)

=== San Mateo County ===
- Phrasel L. Shelton: First African American male judge in San Mateo County, California (1976)
- Dennis Caines: First African American male to serve as the Assistant City Attorney of San Mateo, San Mateo County, California
- Jonathan Karesh (1985): First openly LGBT male to serve as the Presiding Judge of the San Mateo County Superior Court (2019)

=== Santa Barbara County ===
- Frank Ochoa: First Latino American male judge in Santa Barbara County, California in the twentieth century (1983)

=== Santa Clara County ===
- Gabriel Garcia: First Latino American male lawyer in San Jose, California [Santa Clara County, California]
- Wayne M. Kanemoto (1943): First Japanese American male lawyer in Santa Clara County, California
- Delbert E. Wong (1948): First Chinese American male law graduate of Stanford University (1949) [Santa Clara County, California]
- Maurice Hardeman (1955): First African American municipal court judge in Santa Clara County, California (1964). He is also the first African American male to open a law practice in San Jose, California (1955).
- James Chang (1967): First Chinese American male to serve as a Judge of Santa Clara County Superior Court (1989)
- W. Steve Stevens (1972), First African American lawyer for the Santa Clara Public Defenders Office in 1972
- LaDoris H. Cordell (1974), First African American female to serve as a Judge of Santa Clara County Superior Court in 1982
- Thang Nguyen Barrett (1988): First Vietnamese American male to serve as the Deputy District Attorney in Santa Clara County, California (1989)
- Rene Navarro (1976): First Hispanic American male elected as a Judge of the Santa Clara Superior Court (1995)
- Randolf J. Rice: First openly LGBT male appointed as a Judge of the Santa Clara Superior Court (2001)
- Efren N. Iglesia: First Filipino American male judge appointed in the tri-county area of Santa Cruz, Santa Clara, and San Benito Counties. He served on the bench, however, in Monterey County, California.
- Sunil R. Kulkarni: First South Asian male appointed as a Judge of the Santa Clara Superior Court (2013)
- Scott Tsui: First Asian American male to serve as the Assistant District Attorney of Santa Clara County, California (2013)
- Nahal Iravani–Sani: First Iranian American judge in Santa Clara County Superior Court (2017)

=== Santa Cruz County ===
- Peter A. Chang, Jr.: First Asian American male to serve as the District Attorney of Santa Cruz County, California (1966)
- Ron Ruiz (1965): First Latino American male to serve as the District Attorney of Santa Cruz County, California (1999)
- John Salazar (1986): First Latino American male to serve as a Judge of the Superior Court of Santa Cruz County (2000)
- Efren N. Iglesia: First Filipino American male judge appointed in the tri-county area of Santa Cruz, Santa Clara, and San Benito Counties. He served on the bench, however, in Monterey County, California.
- Jerry Vinluan: First Filipino American male to serve as a Judge of the Superior Court of Santa Cruz County (2021)
- Leila Sayar: First Iranian American Judge in Santa Cruz County (2023)

=== Solano County ===
- Lewis F. Brown (1970): First African American male lawyer in Solano County, California
- Osby Davis (1974): First African American male (a lawyer) to serve as a Solano County Board of Supervisor (1979-1993) and the Mayor of Vallejo, California (2007)
- Claro L. Mamaril (1980): First Filipino male lawyer in Solano County, California
- Luis M. Villarreal (1976): First Hispanic American male judge in Solano County, California (upon his appointment to the municipal court in 1982)
- Garry Ichikawa: First Asian American male judge in Solano County, California (2000)
- Robert Bowers: First African American male judge in Solano County, California (2003)

=== Stanislaus County ===
- Charles Edward Aguilar (1962): First Latino American male judge in Stanislaus County, California (1977)
- Sonny Sandhu: First Asian-Pacific Islander male judge in Stanislaus County, California (2018)
- Marcus L. Mumford: First African American male judge in Stanislaus County, California (2021)

=== Sutter County ===
- Fritzgerald Javellana: First Filipino American judge in Sutter County, California (2025)

=== Tulare County ===
- Oscar Overr: First African American to serve as a Justice of the Peace in Allensworth, California (1914) [Tulare County, California]
- Valeriano Saucedo: First Hispanic American male judge in Tulare County, California (2001)

=== Ventura County ===
- Nagao Fujita (1951): First Japanese American male lawyer in Ventura County, California
- Arturo F. Gutierrez: First Latino American male judge in Ventura County, California (upon becoming a trial judge in 1981)
- Herbert Curtis: First African American male judge in Ventura County, California (1998)
- Ferdinand P. Innumerable (1994): First Asian American male judge in Ventura County, California (2014)

== See also ==
- List of first minority male lawyers and judges in the United States

== Other topics of interest ==
- List of first women lawyers and judges in the United States
- List of first women lawyers and judges in California
