= List of American politicians of Armenian descent =

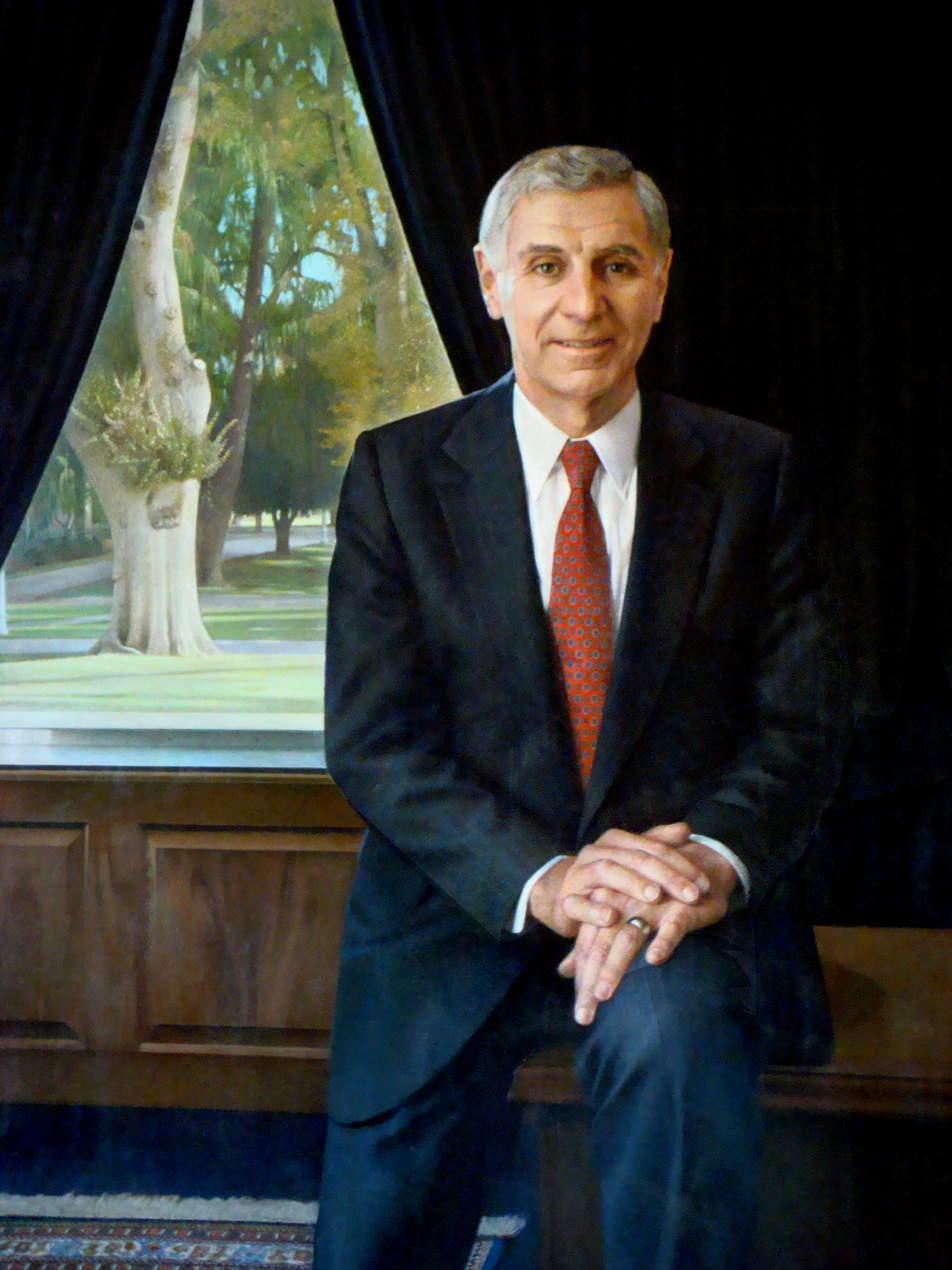
Between 1962 and 1991, George Deukmejian served as a State Assemblyman, Senator, State Attorney General and Governor of California.

This article is the list of Armenian American politicians, officeholders and party chairpersons.

Bold indicates incumbent officeholders.

Note: persons are classified by chronological order

== Federal government ==
=== Cabinet officials ===
| Name | Position | Took office | Left office | President(s) | Ref |
|---|---|---|---|---|---|
| Thomas Corwin (Note: Corwin's (partial) Armenian ancestry was reported by his close friend Samuel S. Cox, U.S. ambassador to Ottoman Turkey, and later cited by others. However, James H. Tashjian noted in 1981 that "Cox's testimony of Corwin's Armenian parentage has not been substantiated by family records or other evidence and that recently references to Corwin as an Armenian have all but ceased.") | Secretary of the Treasury | 23 July 1850 | 6 March 1853 | Millard Fillmore | |
| Paul Ignatius | Secretary of the Navy | 1 September 1967 | 24 January 1969 | Lyndon B. Johnson | |
| Robert Mardian | Assistant Attorney General for the Internal Security Division | 7 November 1970 | March 1972 | Richard Nixon | |
| David Bohigian | Assistant Secretary of Commerce for Market Access and Compliance | December 21, 2005 | January 20, 2009 | George W. Bush | |
| Harry R. Kamian | Principal Deputy Assistant Secretary of State for Energy Resources | 7 September 2021 | 30 June 2023 (Note: acting Assistant Secretary until 19 September 2022) | Joe Biden | |
| Jeff Marootian | Principal Deputy Assistant Secretary of Energy in the Office of Energy Efficiency and Renewable Energy | September 2022 | | Joe Biden | |

=== Executive Office of the President ===
- Ken Khachigian, White House Director of Speechwriting, Reagan Administration
- Aram Bakshian, White House Director of Speechwriting, Reagan Administration (1981–83)
- Ike Hajinazarian, White House Regional Communications Director, Biden Administration (2021)
- Jeff Marootian, Special Assistant to the President for Climate and Science Agency Personnel, Biden Administration (2021–22)
- Jirair Ratevosian, Acting Chief of Staff of John N. Nkengasong, U.S. Global AIDS Coordinator and Special Representative for Global Health Diplomacy in 2022–23

=== Members of Congress ===
| Name | Party | State | Years | Ref |
Senate
| Thomas Corwin | Whig | Ohio | 1845–50 | |
House of Representatives
| Thomas Corwin | Whig | Ohio | 1830–40; 1859–61 | |
| Steven Derounian | Republican | New York | 1953–65 | |
| Adam Benjamin Jr. | Democratic | Indiana | 1977–82 | |
| Chip Pashayan | Republican | California | 1979–91 | |
| Anna Eshoo | Democratic | California | 1993–2025 | |
| John E. Sweeney | Republican | New York | 1999–2007 | |
| Jackie Speier | Democratic | California | 2008–23 | |
| Anthony Brindisi | Democratic | New York | 2019–21 | |

=== Federal Judicial ===
| Name | Position | Dates | Ref |
|---|---|---|---|
| Dickran Tevrizian | Judge of the United States District Court for the Central District of California | 1985–2005 | |
| Samuel Der-Yeghiayan | Judge of the United States District Court for the Northern District of Illinois | 2003–2018 | |

== State government ==
=== Governors ===
| Name | State | Party | Years | Ref |
|---|---|---|---|---|
| Thomas Corwin | Ohio | Whig | 1840–42 | |
| George Deukmejian | California | Republican | 1983–91 | |

=== Other state officials ===
| Name | Party | Position | Years | Ref |
|---|---|---|---|---|
| George Deukmejian | Republican | California Attorney General | 1979–83 | |
| Julia Tashjian | Democratic | Secretary of the State of Connecticut | 1983–91 | |
| Brad Avakian | Democratic | Oregon Commissioner of Labor | 2008–19 | |
| Rachel Kaprielian | Democratic | Massachusetts Secretary of Labor and Workforce Development | 2014–15 | |
| **Peter Koutoujian** | Democratic | Middlesex County Sheriff, Massachusetts | 2011– | |

=== State Judicial ===
| Name | Position | Years | Ref |
|---|---|---|---|
| Steven Derounian | Justice of the New York Supreme Court | 1969–81 | |
| Robert Philibosian | Los Angeles County District Attorney | 1982–84 | |
| Armand Arabian | Justice of the Supreme Court of California | 1990–96 | |
| Marvin R. Baxter | Associate Justice of the Supreme Court of California | 1991–2015 | |
| **Michael Amerian** | Judge of the Los Angeles County Superior Court | 2018– | |
| **Armenui Ashvanian** | Judge of the Los Angeles County Superior Court | 2018– | |
| **Zaven V. Sinanian** | Judge of the Los Angeles County Superior Court | 2002– | |
| Kaye Tertzag | Judge of Wayne County Circuit Court | 1987–2004 | |

=== Legislature ===
==== Lower ====
| Name | Party | State | Years | Ref |
|---|---|---|---|---|
| Gregory Khachadoorian | Republican | Massachusetts | 1959–1971 | |
| George Deukmejian | Republican | California | 1962–1967 | |
| Bob Moretti | Democratic | California | 1965–1974 (speaker 1971–1974) | |
| George Keverian | Democratic | Massachusetts | 1967–1991 (speaker 1985–1991) | |
| Chuck Haytaian | Republican | New Jersey | 1982–1996 (speaker 1992–1996) | |
| Jackie Speier | Democratic | California | 1986–1996 | |
| Chuck Poochigian | Republican | California | 1994–1998 | |
| Howard Kaloogian | Republican | California | 1994–2000 | |
| Rachel Kaprielian | Democratic | Massachusetts | 1995–2008 | |
| Peter Koutoujian | Democratic | Massachusetts | 1997–2011 | |
| Joe Simitian | Democratic | California | 2000–2004 | |
| Ruth Munson | Republican | Illinois | 2002–2009 | |
| Greg Aghazarian | Republican | California | 2002–2008 | |
| Brad Avakian | Democratic | Oregon | 2003–2007 | |
| Paul Krekorian | Democratic | California | 2006–2010 | |
| Katcho Achadjian | Republican | California | 2010–2016 | |
| King Banaian | Republican | Minnesota | 2011–2013 | |
| Sara Gideon | Democratic | Maine | 2012–2020 (speaker 2016–2020) | |
| Adrin Nazarian | Democratic | California | 2012–2022 | |
| **Gary Azarian** | Republican | New Hampshire | 2012– | |
| Charlene Takesian | Republican | New Hampshire | 2012–2016 | |
| **Katherine Kazarian** | Democratic | Rhode Island | 2013– | |
| **John Janigian** | Republican | New Hampshire | 2015– | |
| **David Muradian** | Republican | Massachusetts | 2016– | |
| **Lorig Charkoudian** | Democratic | Maryland | 2019– | |
| Mari Manoogian | Democratic | Michigan | 2019–2022 | |

==== Upper ====
| Name | Party | State | Years | Ref |
|---|---|---|---|---|
| Ned J. Parsekian | Democratic | New Jersey | 1965–1967 | |
| Walter J. Karabian | Democratic | California | 1966–1974 (majority leader 1971–1974) | |
| George Deukmejian | Republican | California | 1967–1979 | |
| Jackie Speier | Democratic | California | 1998–2006 | |
| Brad Avakian | Democratic | Oregon | 2007–2008 | |
| Chuck Poochigian | Republican | California | 1998–2006 | |
| Joe Simitian | Democratic | California | 2004–2012 | |
| Dick Harpootlian | Democratic | South Carolina | 2018–2025 | |
| Laura Murvartian | Democratic | Georgia | 2027– | |

== Municipal government ==
=== Mayors ===
| Name | City | Years | Ref |
|---|---|---|---|
| Robert Sabonjian | Waukegan, Illinois | 1957–77; 1985–89 | |
| Bozant Katzakian | Lodi, California | 1958–59; 1962–64 | |
| Sam Mardian | Phoenix, Arizona | 1960–64 | |
| Peter Torigian | Peabody, Massachusetts | 1978–2001 | |
| Ted Katzakian | Lodi, California | 1979–80 | |
| Haig Paravonian | Waukegan, Illinois | 1989–93 | |
| John Antaramian | Kenosha, Wisconsin | 1992–2008; 2016–2024 | |
| Bill Paparian | Pasadena, California | 1995–97 | |
| Scott Avedisian | Warwick, Rhode Island | 2000–18 | |
| Harry Tutunjian | Troy, New York | 2004–12 | |
| Phil Katzakian | Lodi, California | 2009–10; 2013–14 | |
| Amy Shuklian | Visalia, California | 2011–13 | |
| Marina Khubesrian | South Pasadena, California | 2013–14; 2018–19 | |
| Jack Hadjinian | Montebello, California | 2014–15 | |

Mayors of Glendale, California

| Name | Years |
|---|---|
| Larry Zarian | 1986–87; 1990–91; 1993–94; 1997–98 |
| Rafi Manoukian | 2002–03; 2005–06 |
| Bob Yousefian | 2004–05 |
| Ara Najarian | 2007–08; 2010–11; 2015–16; 2019–20 |
| Zareh Sinanyan | 2014–15; 2018–19 |
| Vartan Gharpetian | 2017–18 |
| Vrej Agajanian | 2020–21 |
| Ardy Kassakhian | 2022–23 |
| Elen Asatryan | 2024-25 |

=== Other ===
- Paul Krekorian, Los Angeles City Council (2010—2022
- Nina Hachigian, Deputy Mayor of International Affairs for Los Angeles (2017–2022)
- **Adrin Nazarian**, Los Angeles City Council (2024–)
- Amy Shuklian, District 3 member of Tulare County, California's Board of Supervisors (2016–present)
- Alek Bartrosouf, member of the Glendale, California's City Council (2026–present)

== Foreign service ==
=== Ambassadors ===
| Name | Position | Years | President(s) | Ref |
|---|---|---|---|---|
| Thomas Corwin | Minister to Mexico | 1861–64 | Abraham Lincoln | |
Edward Djerejian
| Edward Djerejian | Ambassador to Syria | 1988–91 | Ronald Reagan | |
| Edward Djerejian | Assistant Secretary of State for Near Eastern and South Asian Affairs | 1991–93 | George H. W. Bush | |
| Edward Djerejian | Ambassador to Israel | 1993–94 | Bill Clinton | |
William A. Stanton
| William A. Stanton | Chargé d’affaires to Embassy Canberra, Australia | 2005–06 | George W. Bush | |
| William A. Stanton | Director of the American Institute in Taiwan; Deputy Chief of Mission to Embassy Seoul, Korea | 2009–12 | Barack Obama | |
**Nina Hachigian**
| **Nina Hachigian** | Ambassador to the Association of Southeast Asian Nations (ASEAN) | 2014–17 | Barack Obama | |
| **Nina Hachigian** | Special Representative for Subnational Diplomacy | 2022– | Joe Biden | |
| Harry R. Kamian | Deputy Chief of Mission/Deputy Permanent Representative to the U.S. Mission to the OSCE | 2017–2020 (Note: Chargé d’Affaires and Acting Permanent Representative during the first two years.) | Joe Biden | |
| Michael E. Kavoukjian | United States ambassador-designate to Norway | 2025– | Donald Trump | |

=== Others ===
United States Foreign Service

- Leon Dominian, consul in Rome (1921), consul-general in Stuttgart (1930), first secretary of the U.S. legation at Montevideo, Uruguay
- Edward Alexander, deputy director for the Soviet Union and East Europe

== Other political figures ==
- Barry Zorthian, diplomat and press spokesman during the Vietnam War
- Edward N. Costikyan, New York-based political personality
- Danny Tarkanian, Nevada-based politician and candidate
- Terry Phillips, non-partisan candidate for California's 23rd congressional district in 2012
- Scott Ashjian
- David Krikorian
- Paul Paul
- Simon Marootian
- Ralph Moradian
- Haiganush R. Bedrosian
- Robert Hagopian, Saugus, Massachusetts Town 1974
- Jirair Ratevosian, candidate, acting chief of staff to the United States Global AIDS Coordinator (2022–23)

== See also ==
- List of Armenian Americans
- List of Jewish American politicians
