= Gustavus Woodson Wickliffe =

American lawyer (1869–1921)

- Born: 1869; Chattanooga, Tennessee, U.S.
- Died: May 31, 1921 (aged 51–52); Los Angeles, California, U.S.
- Other names: Gustavus Woodson Wickliffe I, G. Woodson Wickliffe
- Education: Howard University
- Known for: first Black lawyer to pass the bar exam in Southern California; first Black lawyer to be admit to practice in the State of California courts

Gustavus Woodson Wickliffe (1869 – 1921) also known as G. Woodson Wickliffe, was an African American lawyer in California. He was the first Black lawyer to pass the bar exam in Southern California, and the first to be admitted to practice in the State of California courts.

== Early life and education ==
Gustavus Woodson Wickliffe was born in 1869, in Chattanooga, Tennessee. He was from a prominent family in the city. He attended Howard High School in Chattanooga and graduated from the law school at Howard University in Washington, D.C.

He married on July 3, 1901, to Minerva "Minnie" Clyde Mitchell. They had a daughter, Caroline Wickliffe Antoine of Washington D.C. and a son, Gustavus Woodson Wickliffe II of Los Angeles. His son and grandson shared the same name (II and III). His son-in-law was Jacques Carmeleau Antoine, the ambassador from Haiti to the United States, who worked for the UN on issues in Africa.

== Career ==
In 1894, he passed the bar exam in Southern California, and was the first Black person to achieve this in Southern California. Two years later in 1896, Washington J. Oglesby was recorded as the first Black person who passed the California State Bar Exam, but he was refused bar admittance until 1902. However R. C. O. Benjamin has also been credited as the first Black lawyer to pass California State Bar Exam in c. 1887 in San Francisco.

Wickliffe lived and worked from 127 N. Main Street in Los Angeles, which is the current Los Angeles City Hall location. His office in 1897 was located at 11 McDonald Building, Los Angeles.

In 1901, Governor Henry T. Gage appointed Wickliffe as a clerk to the California State Board of Harbor Commission. The appointment of Attorney Wickliffe made him the first Black man to hold a position of that kind in this State. He was the first Black attorney admit to practice in the State of California courts. For his appointment, the family moved to San Francisco, where they remained until 1908.

A newspaper commented on the appointment, "the Governor, by this appointment, shows that he does not regard the distribution of a few spittoon jobs among the Negroes as political recognition and by making its puts all of his supporters upon the same level. The position could not have been given to a more worthy gentleman, and his friends, regardless of politics, are elated over his success."

== See also ==
- List of first minority male lawyers and judges in California
