= Gabriel P. Sanchez =

American judge (born 1976)

Gabriel Sanchez
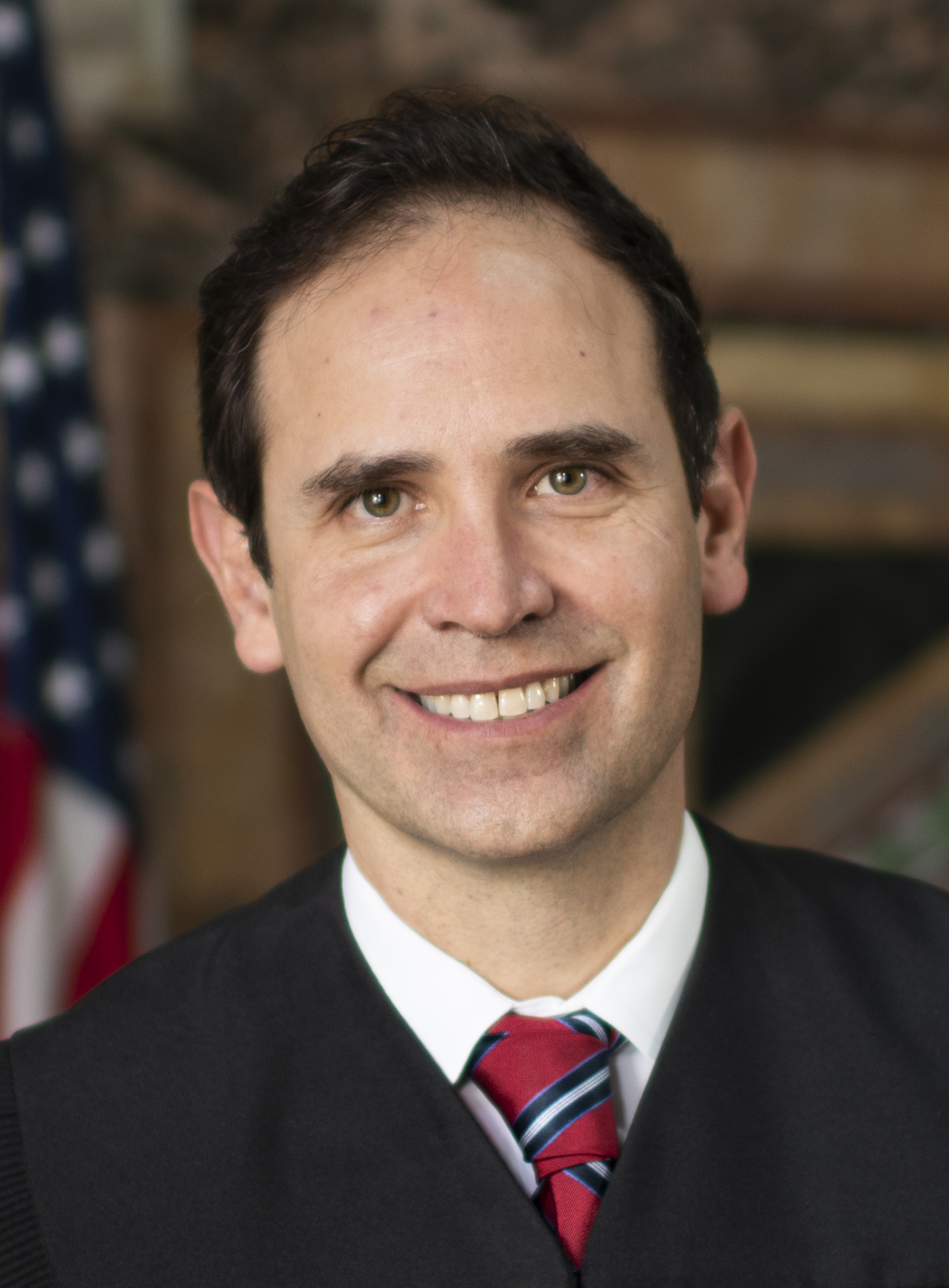

Judge of the United States Court of Appeals for the Ninth Circuit
- Incumbent
- Assumed office January 24, 2022
- Appointed by: Joe Biden
- Preceded by: Marsha Berzon

Associate Justice of the California Court of Appeal for the 1st district
- In office October 26, 2018 – January 24, 2022
- Appointed by: Jerry Brown
- Preceded by: Robert Dondero
- Succeeded by: Monique Langhorne Wilson

Personal details
- Born: Gabriel Patrick Sanchez; 1976 (age 49–50) Fullerton, California, U.S.
- Party: Democratic
- Education: Yale University (BA, JD); University of Cambridge (MPhil)

Gabriel Patrick Sanchez (born 1976) is an American lawyer who has served as a United States circuit judge of the United States Court of Appeals for the Ninth Circuit since 2022. He served as an associate judge of the California Court of Appeal from 2018 to 2022.

== Early life and education ==
A Los Angeles native, Sanchez graduated from Harvard-Westlake School in 1994. He received his Bachelor of Arts, cum laude, from Yale College in 1998. He was a Fulbright Scholar in 1999 in Buenos Aires, Argentina, and in 2000 he received a Master of Philosophy in European Studies from the University of Cambridge. From 2000 to 2002, he worked for McKinsey & Company as a business analyst. He then attended Yale Law School, graduating in 2005 with a Juris Doctor.

== Legal career ==
Sanchez served as a law clerk for Judge Richard Paez of the United States Court of Appeals for the Ninth Circuit from 2005 to 2006. He was an associate at Munger, Tolles & Olson from 2006 to 2011, where he litigated civil matters at the trial and appellate levels. From 2011 to 2012, he worked as a deputy attorney general in the correctional law section of the California Attorney General's office. From 2012 to 2018, he worked as Deputy Legal Affairs Secretary under Governor Jerry Brown.

Sanchez helped draft the Public Safety and Rehabilitation Act of 2016. The act allowed certain non-violent defendants to be considered for parole and established sentence credits for rehabilitation, good behavior, and education.

== Judicial career ==
=== State judicial service ===
In October 2018, Sanchez was nominated by Governor Brown to serve as an Associate Judge of the California Court of Appeal, First Appellate District, filling the vacancy created by the retirement of Justice Robert L. Dondero. His nomination was confirmed by the California Commission on Judicial Appointments on November 26, 2018. His service on the state court terminated when he was elevated to the court of appeals.

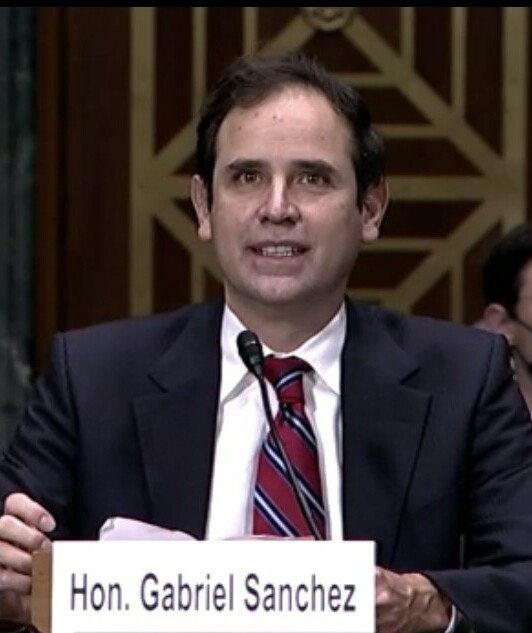
Gabriel Sanchez at Senate confirmation hearing

=== Federal judicial service ===
On September 8, 2021, President Joe Biden announced his intent to nominate Sanchez to serve as a United States circuit judge for the United States Court of Appeals for the Ninth Circuit. On September 20, 2021, his nomination was sent to the Senate. President Biden nominated Sanchez to the seat to be vacated by Judge Marsha Berzon, who announced her intent to assume senior status upon confirmation of a successor. On November 3, 2021, a hearing on his nomination was held before the Senate Judiciary Committee. During his confirmation hearing, Republican senators questioned him about his role in the creation of Proposition 57 in 2016, which allowed for earlier parole for most inmates in California. On December 2, 2021, his nomination was favorably reported by the committee by a 12–10 vote. On December 15, 2021, Majority Leader Chuck Schumer filed cloture on his nomination. On December 18, 2021, the United States Senate invoked cloture on his nomination by a 44–24 vote. On January 12, 2022, Sanchez was confirmed by a 52–47 vote. He received his judicial commission on January 24, 2022.

== See also ==
- List of first minority male lawyers and judges in California
- List of Hispanic and Latino American jurists

Legal offices
Preceded by Marsha Berzon	Judge of the United States Court of Appeals for the Ninth Circuit; 2022–present	Incumbent
