= Marsha Berzon =

American judge (born 1945)

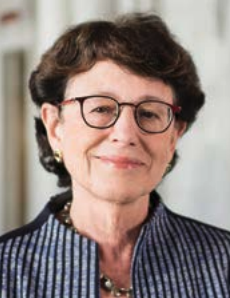

Senior Judge of the United States Court of Appeals for the Ninth Circuit
- Incumbent
- Assumed office January 23, 2022

Judge of the United States Court of Appeals for the Ninth Circuit
- In office March 16, 2000 – January 23, 2022
- Appointed by: Bill Clinton
- Preceded by: John T. Noonan Jr.
- Succeeded by: Gabriel P. Sanchez

Personal details
- Born: Marsha Lee Siegel; April 17, 1945 (age 81) Cincinnati, Ohio, U.S.
- Party: Democratic
- Spouse: Stephen Berzon
- Children: Alexandra Berzon (daughter)
- Education: Harvard University (BA); University of California, Berkeley (JD)

Marsha Lee Berzon (née Siegel; born April 17, 1945) is a senior United States circuit judge of the United States Court of Appeals for the Ninth Circuit.

== Education and legal training ==
Berzon graduated with a Bachelor of Arts degree from Radcliffe College of Harvard University in 1966 and received a Juris Doctor from U.C. Berkeley School of Law at the University of California, Berkeley in 1973. While at law school, Berzon was a contributor to the California Law Review. She then clerked for Judge James R. Browning of the Ninth Circuit from 1973 to 1974. Berzon then clerked for Justice William J. Brennan Jr. of the United States Supreme Court. She was Brennan's first female law clerk.

== Career ==
Berzon was in private practice in Washington, D.C. from 1975 to 1977 and then moved to San Francisco, California where she practiced from 1978 to 2000. Berzon had a unique Supreme Court litigation practice and litigated many of the landmark cases during that period, including UAW v. Johnson Controls, 499 U.S. 187 (1991). Berzon was also a lecturer at UC Berkeley in 1992 and a practitioner-in-residence at Cornell Law School in 1994.

== Federal judicial service ==
On January 27, 1998, Berzon was nominated by Bill Clinton to the Ninth Circuit for the seat vacated when John T. Noonan assumed senior status on December 27, 1996. Clinton renominated Berzon on January 26, 1999. Berzon was confirmed by the U.S. Senate by a 64–34 vote on March 9, 2000. She received her commission on March 16, 2000. On April 6, 2021, she announced her intent to assume senior status upon confirmation of a successor. She assumed senior status on January 23, 2022.

== Notable cases ==
=== Pre-2015 ===
On February 10, 2003, Berzon dissented from denial of en banc after a panel rejected a Washington State Patrol cadet's claim that he was forced to resign due to lack of religious accommodations.

In the disability rights case Molski v. Evergreen Dynasty Corp. (9th Cir. 2008), Berzon warned that the majority's decision could be detrimental to the enforcement of civil rights laws.

In a 2009 decision, Berzon wrote that while a San Francisco resolution condemning the Vatican was in line with current Establishment Clause jurisprudence, she was troubled by how close the resolution came to the establishment of an anti-Catholic stance.

Also in 2009, Berzon dissented in Abebe v. Holder, an immigration case by a lawful permanent resident seeking protection for deportation. Berzon, joined by several other liberal judges, argued that allowing the deportation of Abebe violates equal protection.

On May 21, 2013, Berzon blocked Arizona's 20-week abortion ban, saying it was more restrictive than the Partial-Birth Abortion Ban.

In October 2014, Berzon joined an opinion that held same sex marriage bans in Idaho and Nevada violated the U.S. Constitution. She wrote a concurring opinion concluding that the prohibitions were not only discrimination based upon sexual orientation, but a form of gender discrimination and therefore subject to heightened scrutiny.

=== 2016 ===
On April 5, 2016, Berzon wrote a concurrence when the 9th Circuit ruled that DACA dreamers cannot be denied driver's licenses. The majority opinion, which Berzon joined, was written by Harry Pregerson.

=== 2017 ===
On July 28, 2017, in United States v. Martinez-Lopez, Berzon dissented when an en banc panel allowed multiple convictions for a single offense using multiple drugs. Berzon wrote that a substance must be named, and that multiple convictions for a single offense was a violation of California's multiple convictions code. Berzon was joined by Stephen Reinhardt and Sidney Runyan Thomas, for all except part four.

=== 2018 ===
On April 9, 2018, in Rizo v. Yovino, Berzon joined the opinion of Stephen Reinhardt that said prior pay may not be considered for deciding one's salary, under the Equal Protection Act, due to the gender wage gap. Reinhardt's opinion was remanded back to the 9th Circuit on February 25, 2019. The 9th Circuit came to the same conclusion on February 27, 2020, after another judge had been selected to replace Reinhardt on the panel.

=== 2019 ===
On April 1, 2019, Berzon concurred in the denial of en banc after a panel held that municipal ordinances that criminalize sleeping, sitting, or lying in all public spaces, when no alternative sleeping space is available, violates the 8th Amendment.

On May 3, 2019, Berzon joined an opinion ruling for a 14 year old illegal immigrant, saying his deportation would cause him harm. Berzon wrote in a concurrence that the immigrant had shown proof of harm, but she was upset that the court did not mention 5th Amendment rights. Berzon would have ruled that the 5th Amendment guarantees a right of due process for illegal immigrant minors. Richard Paez wrote a similar concurrence also saying that illegal immigrants were entitled to due process under the 5th Amendment, which Berzon and William A. Fletcher joined. However, the holding only gave that particular illegal immigrant relief, not extending 5th Amendment rights to others, since there were only three votes of eleven total for the 5th Amendment rights.

On August 15, 2019, Berzon ruled in a 3-0 decision that detained migrant children must get soap, sleep, and clean water. She wrote that those necessities were essential to the children's safety.

=== 2020 ===
In Ceren v. Barr, decided on March 5, 2020, Berzon dissented, arguing that the Immigration Judge abused their discretion by refusing to allow the defendant's attorney, who was ill, to finish her closing arguments.

On September 2, 2020, Berzon ruled that the NSA program that spied on Americans' cell phones is illegal.

=== 2021-present ===
Although Berzon voted to largely bar a lawsuit against big tech companies arguing that they are responsible for a terror attack, she called for the Court to take the case en banc to reconsider precedent that protects such algorithms from Section 230 liability. On January 3, 2022, Berzon voted to rehear the case en banc, as did Judge Gould (also a member of the panel), but the majority of the Court's active judges voted against rehearing.

In Lemos v. County of Sonoma, handed down on July 16, 2021, Berzon wrote a 19-page dissent when the majority barred Gabbi Lemos, from filing an excessive force suit against a police officer. The police officer "threw her to the ground" for allegedly "interfering with their investigation".

Berzon dissented from the September 10, 2021, decision Brandon Hodges v. Comcast. Hodges, a former Comcast user, sued Comcast in a class action lawsuit for allegedly collecting data about subscribers' television viewing activity and personal demographic data without their consent. The majority dismissed the lawsuit.

In United States v. Wilson (9th Cir. September 21, 2021), Berzon, writing for a unanimous panel, ruled that the police cannot open someone's email attachments without a warrant.

In Frahait v. ICE, decided October 20, 2021, Berzon, in dissent, argued that ICE violated the 5th amendment by its inaction on the medical needs of vulnerable immigrants it had detained.

Berzon dissented in the Americans with Disabilities Act lawsuit, D.D. v. LAUSD, decided November 19, 2021. The decision was 6-5 on unusual lines; the 5 dissenters were Berzon, 2 other liberals, and 2 textualist conservatives (who wrote their own dissenting opinion).

Berzon wrote a 44-page concurring opinion in Duncan v. Bonta, a major 2nd amendment case challenging a law that limits gun magazine capacity to 10 bullets. Berzon's concurrence went through the history of firearms and explained what a judge's role should be. Berzon explained that small sample sizes often create an issue in experiments that judges cite to argue their point, and citing Daniel Kahneman, she explained that "Sample size issues and the drive to draw a single legal conclusion are not the only potential methodological pitfalls for the “text, history, and tradition” test. Cognitive biases ranging from confirmation bias to anchoring bias can cloud a judge’s analysis.2 And very few judges have received formal training on technical elements of historiographical research design, such as the importance of drawing from varied sources and assessing sources to ferret out potential bias imparted by the author."

On December 4, 2021, Berzon was one of two judges who declined to halt San Diego Unified School District's requirements that students be vaccinated by December 20.

In California Chamber of Commerce v. Council for Education and Research on Toxics, Berzon wrote a strongly worded statement critical of the court's decision to limit access to the courts using the so-called "illegal objective" exception. According to Berzon, the decision "allows a single judge to enjoin potential plaintiffs from filing any sort of lawsuit if the judge predicts that the lawsuits will fail upon a defense grounded in a federal right" and will severely limit enforcement of California's Proposition 65, which aims to reduce toxic chemicals in drinking water. Berzon was joined by Kim McLane Wardlaw, Paul J. Watford, Lucy Koh, and Gabriel P. Sanchez.

On August 1, 2025, Berzon ruled that ICE cannot detain people based on their race, language, accent, occupation, or location.

== Personal life ==
Berzon is the mother of Alexandra Berzon, a Pulitzer Prize-winning investigative reporter.

== See also ==
- List of law clerks for the third seat of the Supreme Court of the United States

Legal offices
Preceded by John T. Noonan Jr.	Judge of the United States Court of Appeals for the Ninth Circuit; 2000–2022	Succeeded by Gabriel P. Sanchez
