= Judge Sanchez =

Judge Sanchez may refer to:

- Gabriel P. Sanchez (born 1976), judge of the United States Court of Appeals for the Ninth Circuit
- Juan Ramon Sánchez (judge) (born 1955), judge of the United States District Court for the Eastern District of Pennsylvania

== See also ==
- Judge Sanchez, a minor character in Judge Dredd media
