= Washington J. Oglesby =

American lawyer (1859–1902)

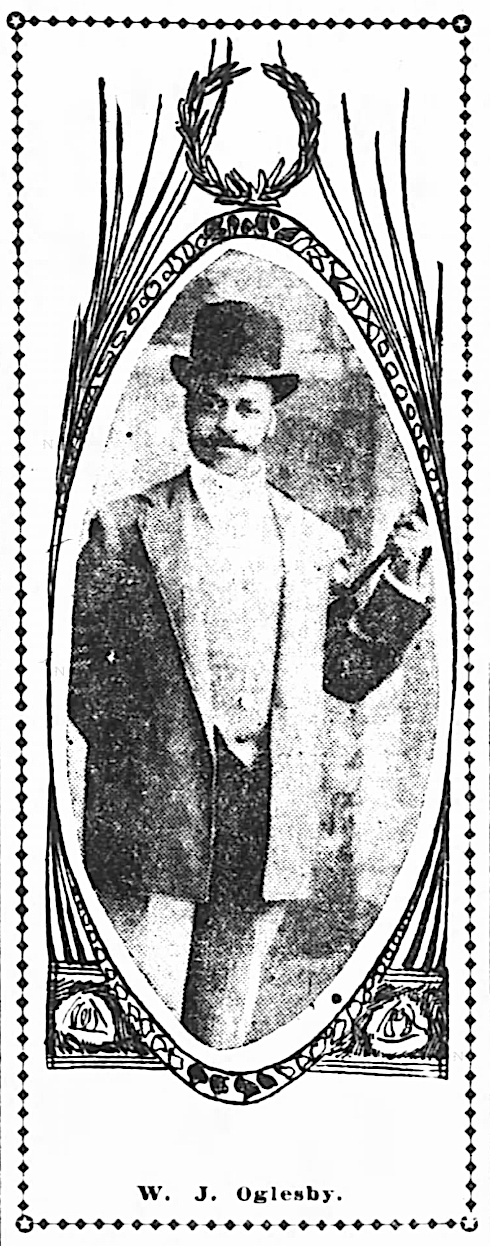
- Photograph of Oglesby from 1902
- Born: 1859; Virginia, U.S.
- Died: July 6, 1902 (aged 42–43); Oakland, California, U.S.
- Burial place: Mountain View Cemetery, Oakland, California, U.S.
- Other names: Washington Jacob Oglesby, Washington Jackson Oglesby
- Spouse: Elise Burkart

Washington J. Oglesby (1859 – July 6, 1902) was an American lawyer, and politician in Oakland, California. He is said to be the first Black lawyer admitted to the bar by the State of California when he passed in 1896, his case went to the Supreme Court of California, and he was refused bar admittance until 1902.

He also worked as a school teacher and real estate agent in his early career. In 1894 he ran for justice of the peace in Alameda County, California, and he lost to judge F. C. Clift. His campaign had been endorsed by the People's Party.

He died of a heart condition at age 43 on July 6, 1902, in Oakland, California, and was buried at Mountain View Cemetery in Oakland. He left a widow, Elise Burkart and her two children from a prior marriage.

== See also ==
- List of first minority male lawyers and judges in California
- R.C.O. Benjamin (1855–1900) early Black lawyer and newspaper editor, also said to be the first Black lawyer to be admitted by the state bar
