= Gregory Khachadoorian =

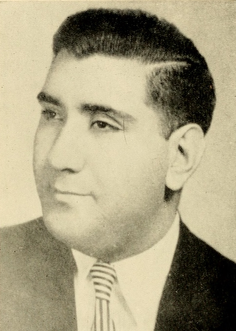
- Khachadoorian, circa 1967

Member of the Massachusetts House of Representatives from the 28th Middlesex district
- In office January 7, 1959 – January 6, 1971
- Preceded by: Hollis Gott
- Succeeded by: John F. Cusack

Personal details
- Born: July 8, 1928 South Boston, Massachusetts
- Died: May 18, 1993 (aged 64) Fort Lauderdale, Florida
- Party: Republican

Gregory Benjamin Khachadoorian (July 8, 1928 – May 18, 1993) was an American politician who served in the Massachusetts House of Representatives as a Republican, representing the 28th Middlesex district.

== Early life and education ==
Khachadoorian was born on July 8, 1928 in South Boston, Massachusetts. He was the son of Benjamin Khachadoorian, an Armenian immigrant and shoemaker. In 1943, at the age of 14, he was involved in a gas station accident which left him permanently blind. He was educated at Perkins School for the Blind, and transferred to Arlington High School to finish his senior year, where he became an honor student. In 1948, he became the first blind student to graduate from Arlington High School. He then attended Boston University, receiving his bachelor of science (BS) in 1952 and his bachelor of laws (LLB) in 1955, and began working as a lawyer.

== Political career ==
Khachadoorian was first elected to the Massachusetts House of Representatives in 1958, beating Democratic incumbent Hollis Gott. On October 31, 1961, he was appointed to the Massachusetts Republican State Committee by House Minority Leader Sidney Curtiss. He served in the Massachusetts House until 1970, when he was defeated by Democratic challenger John F. Cusack.

== Death ==
Khachadoorian died on May 18, 1993, at Cleveland Clinic Hospital in Fort Lauderdale, Florida.
