= Alexandra Berzon =

American journalist

- Born: Alexandra Eve Berzon; 1979 (age 46–47); Berkeley, California, U.S.
- Education: Vassar College (AB); University of California, Berkeley (MJ)
- Relatives: Marsha Berzon (mother)

Alexandra Berzon (born 1979) is an American investigative reporter for The New York Times. She previously wrote for ProPublica and The Wall Street Journal. Her 2008 series of investigative stories about the deaths of construction workers on the Las Vegas Strip for the Las Vegas Sun won the 2009 Pulitzer Prize for Public Service and The Hillman Prize.

The Public Service Pulitzer cited "the courageous reporting by Alexandra Berzon, for the exposure of the high death rate among construction workers on the Las Vegas Strip amid lax enforcement of regulations, leading to changes in policy and improved safety conditions." The centerpiece was a four-part series entitled "Construction Deaths". Berzon began her investigation after nine construction workers died in eight separate accidents. Her series exposed the Occupational Safety and Health Administration's lax enforcement of regulations and highlighted the cozy relationship between safety regulators and builders.

The series was cited in congressional hearings examining OSHA's record and led to changes in policy and improved safety conditions.

== Life ==
Before the Sun, Berzon was a reporter for Red Herring, a business and technology magazine, and worked for the Anchorage Daily News and San Antonio Express-News. She has also reported for Salon.com, NPR, and American Public Media's American RadioWorks. Her coverage of South Pacific islanders who had emigrated to New Zealand due to fears of sea level rise was part of a series that won the George Polk Award for Radio Reporting in 2007.

Berzon grew up in Berkeley, California and graduated from Concord Academy in 1997, then Vassar College in 2001. She then earned a master’s in journalism from the UC Berkeley Graduate School of Journalism in 2006. Her mother, Marsha Berzon, is a circuit judge on the Ninth Circuit Court of Appeals.

== Awards ==
In addition to the Pulitzer for Public Service, Berzon has won Story of the Year, News Feature of the Year, and the First Amendment Award from the Nevada Press Association. She was also part of a team of The Wall Street Journal journalists that won the Gerald Loeb Award for Large Newspapers for coverage of the Deepwater Horizon crisis. She and other graduate school classmates won a Polk Award for their radio series on early signs of global warming, which aired on PRI's Living on Earth and American Public Media's American RadioWorks.
