= Chan Chung Wing =

American lawyer

Chan Chung Wing, also known as C.C. Wing, was the first Chinese American lawyer in California (State Bar Number 2326). Wing was born in 1890 as the son of Chinese merchants in a Canton village. He graduated from the University of St. Ignatius College of Law (now known as the University of San Francisco School of Law) in 1918 and started working as a lawyer in the San Francisco community.

Wing specialized in immigration law, working with hundreds of Chinese immigrants who sought to make a new life in the United States. Chinese immigrants who came to San Francisco were detained at Angel Island for as much as two years, while immigration officials determined their eligibility for entry. Wing also brought more than 30 lawsuits against the San Francisco Police Department for the harassment of the Chinese. Because the Chinese Exclusion Act of 1882 was in effect, anti-Chinese racism was widespread.

During the 1930s, Wing served as the first Chinese American head counsel for the Chinese branch of the foreign exchange department of the Bank of Italy. In the 1940s, Wing opened one of the first life insurance agencies in Chinatown. Throughout his professional life, Wing was an active member of the University of San Francisco Alumni Association, and he inaugurated the C.C. Wing Classic Golf Tournament.

Wing died in 1983, but not before he saw one of his five children, Linda Chan, graduate from the University of San Francisco School of Law.

Although other sources cite You Chung Hong as the first Chinese American lawyer in California, he did not pass the bar until 1923 (State Bar Number 4788).

== See also ==
- List of first minority male lawyers and judges in California
