= Ronald Whyte =

American judge (1942–2023)

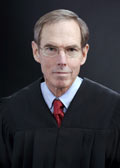

Senior judge of the United States District Court for the Northern District of California
- In office March 2, 2009 – April 10, 2023

Judge of the United States District Court for the Northern District of California
- In office March 2, 1992 – March 2, 2009
- Appointed by: George H. W. Bush
- Preceded by: Seat established by 104 Stat. 5089
- Succeeded by: Lucy Koh

Judge of the Santa Clara County Superior Court
- In office May 1, 1989 – March 2, 1992
- Appointed by: George Deukmejian

Personal details
- Born: Ronald McLeod Whyte; October 25, 1942 Pomona, California, U.S.
- Died: April 10, 2023 (aged 80) Los Gatos, California, U.S.
- Education: Wesleyan University (AB); University of Southern California (JD)

Military service
- Branch/service: United States Navy
- Years of service: 1968–1971 (active); 1971–1974 (reserve)
- Rank: Lieutenant
- Unit: J.A.G. Corps

Ronald McLeod Whyte (October 25, 1942 – April 10, 2023) was United States district judge of the United States District Court for the Northern District of California in San Jose, California.

== Education and career ==
Born in Pomona, California, Whyte earned an Artium Baccalaureus degree in mathematics from Wesleyan University in Middletown, Connecticut, in 1964, and a Juris Doctor from the USC Gould School of Law in Los Angeles, California, in 1967. From 1965 to 1967 he was a legal intern for the law firm of Nichols, Stead, Boileau and Lamb and later for the Kenneth Hahn Hall of Administration in Los Angeles. He also was a server and manager for two different small companies. Whyte was in private practice from 1967 to 1968 in Claremont, California. He then served as a lieutenant in the United States Navy from 1968 to 1971 as part of the Judge Advocate General Corps. While in the Navy he served as a judge of military courts from 1969 to 1971. He returned to private practice from 1971 to 1989, working at Hoge, Fenton, Jones & Appel Inc. in San Jose, California. In 1989, Governor George Deukmejian appointed him as a Santa Clara County Superior Court judge.

== Federal judicial service ==
On July 26, 1991, President George H. W. Bush nominated Whyte to a new seat on the United States District Court for the Northern District of California created by 104 Stat. 5089. He was confirmed by the United States Senate on February 6, 1992, and received his commission on March 2, 1992. He assumed senior status on March 2, 2009. He assumed inactive status on November 1, 2016. Whyte died on April 10, 2023, at the age of 80.

== Patent rules ==
Whyte originated and led the development of the Northern District of California's Local Patent Rules, which have been adopted by district courts across the country. Whyte also led the development of model jury instructions – including patent jury instructions – and protective orders. Stanford Law Professor Mark Lemley also called Whyte "the Dean of the Silicon Valley bench."

Whyte's professional activities included serving on the Dean of Santa Clara Law School's High Tech Advisory Council (2001–20??), the Executive Committee Santa Clara Inn of Court (1992-2013; president 1997–1998), the Patent Rules Committee for the Northern District of California (1996– ?), Patent Jury Instruction Committee for the Northern District of California (2000–20??), and member of the National Jury Instruction Project (2008–2009).

Whyte also sat by designation on panels of both the United States Court of Appeals for the Ninth Circuit and the United States Court of Appeals for the Federal Circuit and authored published opinions in both courts.

== Selected accolades ==
- Santa Clara County Trial Lawyers Association's Judge of the Year Award (1992)
- Berkeley Center for Law and Technology's Distinguished Service Award (2001)
- Santa Clara County Trial Lawyers Association's Federal Judge of the Year Award (2003)
- Santa Clara County Trial Lawyers Association's Special Recognition Award (2009)
- Lifetime Achievement Award from the Sedona Conference (2013)

== Sources ==
- Confirmation hearings on federal appointments : hearings before the Committee on the Judiciary, United States Senate, One Hundred Second Congress, first session, on confirmation hearings on appointments to the federal judiciary. pt.7 (1993)

Legal offices
Preceded by Seat established by 104 Stat. 5089	Judge of the United States District Court for the Northern District of California; 1992–2009	Succeeded by Lucy Koh
