= S. James Otero =

American judge (born 1951)

Senior Judge of the United States District Court for the Central District of California
- In office December 30, 2018 – April 10, 2020

Judge of the United States District Court for the Central District of California
- In office February 12, 2003 – December 30, 2018
- Appointed by: George W. Bush
- Preceded by: Richard Paez
- Succeeded by: Fernando L. Aenlle-Rocha

Judge of the Los Angeles Superior Court
- In office 1990–2003

Personal details
- Born: Samuel James Otero; December 30, 1951 (age 74) Los Angeles, California, U.S.
- Education: California State University, Northridge (BA); Stanford Law School (JD)

Samuel James Otero (born December 30, 1951) is a former United States district judge of the United States District Court for the Central District of California.

== Early life and education ==
Otero was born in Los Angeles, California. He received a Bachelor of Arts degree from California State University, Northridge in 1973 and a Juris Doctor from Stanford Law School in 1976.

== Career ==
Otero was an attorney for the Los Angeles City Attorney's Office from 1976 to 1987. He was Regional Counsel for Southern Pacific Transportation Company from 1987 to 1988.

=== State judicial service ===
Otero was a judge on the Los Angeles Municipal Court from 1988 to 1990 and then a judge on the Los Angeles Superior Court from 1990 to 2003.

=== Federal judicial service ===
On January 7, 2003, President George W. Bush nominated Otero to a seat on the Central District vacated by Judge Richard Paez. He was confirmed by the United States Senate on February 10, 2003, by a 94–0 vote, and received his commission two days later. He assumed senior status on December 30, 2018, on his 67th birthday. He retired on April 10, 2020.

== Notable cases ==
=== Association of Christian Schools International v. Stearns (2008) ===
Otero wrote that the Calvary Chapel Christian School "provided no evidence of animus" on the part of university officials, who he said had a "rational basis" for determining that the proposed Calvary courses would not meet the UC college preparatory requirements. He said that UC's review committees cited legitimate reasons for rejecting the texts - not because they contained religious viewpoints, but because they omitted important topics in science and history and failed to teach critical thinking.

On January 26, 2009, ACSI filed an appeal on the decision. On January 12, 2010, the Ninth Circuit Court of Appeals affirmed the federal district court's summary judgment in favor of the University of California. On October 12, 2010, the Supreme Court declined to review the case, effectively ending it.

=== Valentini v. McDonald case (2013) ===
On August 29, 2013, Otero ruled that by not using the land to provide health care for armed forces veterans, the VA was in violation of federal law. He stated in his ruling that the agency had abused its discretion by leasing land for purposes "totally divorced from the provision of healthcare," but delayed enforcement of his order so the government could appeal.

West Los Angeles Veterans' Administration lease of VA land for the Jackie Robinson Stadium to UCLA, a film studio storage lot and other businesses were deemed illegal and their agreements were held void.

=== Clifford v. Essential Consultants (2018) ===
In March 2018, Otero was assigned the case of Clifford v. Essential Consultants, LLC et al., which is the federal case that encompasses the details of the Stormy Daniels–Donald Trump scandal. Otero dismissed Daniels (real name Stephanie Clifford) defamation claim on October 15, 2018, ruling that the tweet was protected by the First Amendment.

He expanded on his ruling stating, "If this Court were to prevent Mr. Trump from engaging in this type of 'rhetorical hyperbole' against a political adversary, it would significantly hamper the office of the President. Any strongly-worded response by a president to another politician or public figure could constitute an action for defamation. This would deprive this country of the 'discourse' common to the political process." Daniels's other claims remain pending.

== See also ==
- Association of Christian Schools International v. Stearns
- List of Hispanic and Latino American jurists

== Sources ==
Legal offices
Preceded by Richard Paez	Judge of the United States District Court for the Central District of California; 2003–2018	Succeeded by Fernando L. Aenlle-Rocha
