= Fernando Aenlle-Rocha =

Cuban-American judge (born 1961)

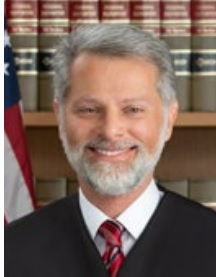

Judge of the United States District Court for the Central District of California
- Incumbent
- Assumed office December 22, 2020
- Appointed by: Donald Trump
- Preceded by: S. James Otero

Judge of the Los Angeles County Superior Court
- In office May 22, 2017 – December 22, 2020
- Appointed by: Jerry Brown
- Preceded by: Jane L. Johnson
- Succeeded by: Tara L. Newman

Personal details
- Born: Fernando Lazaro Aenlle-Rocha; 1961 (age 64–65) Havana, Cuba
- Party: Republican
- Education: Princeton University (AB); University of California, Berkeley (JD)

Fernando Lazaro Aenlle-Rocha (born 1961) is a United States district judge of the United States District Court for the Central District of California and former California state court judge.

== Early life and career ==
Aenlle-Rocha earned his Artium Baccalaureus from Princeton University in 1983 and his Juris Doctor from the UC Berkeley School of Law in 1986. He began his career as a deputy district attorney in the Los Angeles County District Attorney's office. From 1990 to 1994, he was an Assistant United States Attorney for the Southern District of Florida. In 1994, he moved back to California and became an Assistant United States Attorney for the Central District of California.

In 1999, Aenlle-Rocha entered private practice as an associate with Stephan, Oringher, Richman & Theodora in Los Angeles. In 2000, he became a partner at McDermott Will & Emery. From 2005 to 2017, Aenlle-Rocha was a partner at White & Case, where he focused on commercial litigation, white collar criminal defense, and corporate corruption investigations. He was appointed by California Governor Jerry Brown to the Los Angeles County Superior Court in 2017, where he served until becoming a federal judge.

=== Federal judicial service ===
On August 28, 2019, President Donald Trump announced his intent to nominate Aenlle-Rocha to serve as a United States district judge of the United States District Court for the Central District of California. On October 17, 2019, his nomination was sent to the Senate. President Trump nominated Aenlle-Rocha to the seat vacated by Judge S. James Otero, who assumed senior status on December 30, 2018. A hearing on his nomination before the Senate Judiciary Committee was held on December 4, 2019. On January 3, 2020, his nomination was returned to the President under Rule XXXI, Paragraph 6 of the United States Senate. On January 9, 2020, he was renominated to the same seat. On March 5, 2020, his nomination was reported out of committee by voice vote.

On December 20, 2020, the Senate invoked cloture on his nomination by an 82–7 vote. On December 20, 2020, his nomination was confirmed by an 80–8 vote. He received his judicial commission on December 22, 2020.

== See also ==
- List of Hispanic and Latino American jurists

Legal offices
Preceded by Jane L. Johnson	Judge of the Los Angeles County Superior Court; 2017–2020	Succeeded by Tara L. Newman
Preceded by S. James Otero	Judge of the United States District Court for the Central District of California; 2020–present	Incumbent
