= John F. Cusack =

American politician (1937–2014)

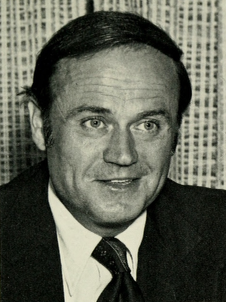
- Cusack, circa 1983

Member of the Massachusetts House of Representatives
- In office 1971–1986

Personal details
- Born: October 5, 1937
- Died: September 11, 2014 (aged 76)
- Party: Democratic

John F. Cusack (October 5, 1937 – September 11, 2014) was an American politician.

== Life and career ==
John F. Cusack was born on October 5, 1937, and raised in Medford, Massachusetts. He later moved to Arlington, where he lived throughout his tenure on the Massachusetts House of Representatives. Cusack served continuously as a state representative from 1971 to 1986. During his first two terms, Cusack occupied the 7th Middlesex district seat. This was followed by two terms holding the 9th Middlesex district seat. Cusack subsequently represented the 25th Middlesex district for four terms until his retirement. He died on September 11, 2014, at the age of 76.

He is known for his successful opposition to a planned extension of the MBTA Red Line in the late 1970s, sponsoring a state bill to ban MBTA facilities within 75 yards of Arlington Catholic High School. He claimed that "all it would do is move Harvard Square problems to Arlington." After nearly 50 years in force, the ban was repealed in late 2024.
