= Lucy Koh =

American judge (born 1968)

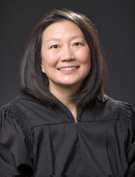

Judge of the United States Court of Appeals for the Ninth Circuit
- Incumbent
- Assumed office December 14, 2021
- Appointed by: Joe Biden
- Preceded by: Richard Paez

Judge of the United States District Court for the Northern District of California
- In office June 9, 2010 – December 15, 2021
- Appointed by: Barack Obama
- Preceded by: Ronald Whyte
- Succeeded by: P. Casey Pitts

Personal details
- Born: August 7, 1968 (age 58) Washington, D.C., U.S.
- Party: Democratic
- Spouse: Tino Cuéllar
- Education: Harvard University (BA, JD)

Lucy Haeran Koh (born August 7, 1968) is an American lawyer serving as a United States circuit judge of the United States Court of Appeals for the Ninth Circuit. Koh previously served as a United States district judge of the United States District Court for the Northern District of California from 2010 to 2021. She also served as a California state court judge of the Santa Clara County Superior Court from 2008 to 2010. She is the first Korean American woman to serve on a federal appellate court in the United States.

== Early life and education ==
Born on August 7, 1968, in Washington, D.C., Koh was the first member of her family to be born in the United States. Her mother, a refugee from North Korea, had escaped the country at the age of ten after walking two weeks to South Korea. Her father was a veteran of the Korean War, where he fought Communist forces.

Koh spent most of her childhood in Mississippi, where her mother was an academic at Alcorn State University. She also spent parts of her youth in Maryland and Oklahoma. In 1986, Koh graduated from Norman High School in 1986 in Norman, Oklahoma. She attended Harvard College, where she was awarded a Harry S. Truman Scholarship and graduated in 1990 with a Bachelor of Arts, magna cum laude, in social studies. She then attended Harvard Law School, where she was a semifinalist in the Ames Moot Court Competition and graduated in 1993 with a Juris Doctor.

== Legal career ==
From 1993 to 1994, Koh worked for the United States Senate Committee on the Judiciary as a Women's Law and Public Policy Fellow. From 1994 to 1997, she worked for the United States Department of Justice, first as a Special Counsel in the Office of Legislative Affairs (1994–1996) and then as a Special Assistant to the Deputy Attorney General (1996–1997).

From 1997 to 2000, Koh served as an assistant United States attorney in the United States Attorney's Office for the Central District of California. From 2000 to 2002, she worked as a senior associate at Wilson Sonsini Goodrich & Rosati, a Palo Alto law firm. From 2002 to 2008, Koh worked as a litigation partner at the Silicon Valley office of the law firm McDermott Will & Emery representing technology companies in patent, trade secret, and commercial civil matters.

== Judicial service ==
=== California state court service ===
In January 2008, California Governor Arnold Schwarzenegger appointed Koh to the Santa Clara County Superior Court, a position she held until 2010, when she became a federal judge.

=== Federal judicial service ===
==== District court service ====
On January 20, 2010, President Barack Obama nominated Koh on the recommendation of California Senators Barbara Boxer and Dianne Feinstein to a seat on the United States District Court for the Northern District of California vacated by Judge Ronald M. Whyte, who assumed senior status in 2009. On February 11, the Senate Judiciary Committee held a hearing on her nomination. On March 4, the Senate Judiciary Committee favorably reported her nomination. The Senate confirmed Koh by a 90–0 vote on June 7 and she received her commission on June 9. Her service as the district court judge was terminated on December 15, 2021, when she was elevated to the court of appeals.

As a district judge, Koh presided over litigation including Apple Inc. v. Samsung Electronics Co., In re High-Tech Employee Antitrust Litigation, FTC v. Qualcomm (finding antitrust liability for conduct in licensing standard-essential patents, later reversed), and multi-district litigation, including the Yahoo and Anthem data breaches and Apple and Google privacy litigation.

In 2020, Koh presided over a case in which a coalition of local governments, activist groups, and American Indian tribes sued the Commerce Department over the Trump administration's intention to end the 2020 Census early. She issued a ruling that resulted in extending the once-a-decade count from September 30 to October 15.

Koh presided over Tandon v. Newsom, a challenge brought by plaintiffs' challenging California restrictions on gatherings during the COVID-19 pandemic. Koh denied the plaintiffs' request for an injunction seeking to block the restrictions "insofar as they (1) ban indoor religious gatherings at their homes, including Bible studies, theological discussions, collective prayer, and musical prayer; and (2) limit outdoor religious gatherings at their homes to three households"; in February 2021, she ruled that the restrictions did not violate the Free Exercise Clause because "the State's private gatherings restrictions treat religious and secular gatherings alike and make no reference to religion." The Ninth Circuit affirmed Koh's decision but its ruling was overturned by the United States Supreme Court, which issued an order, on a 5–4 vote, determining that the restriction on religious gatherings in private homes was unconstitutional.

==== Expired nomination to court of appeals under Obama ====
On February 25, 2016, President Obama nominated Koh to serve as a United States circuit judge for the United States Court of Appeals for the Ninth Circuit, to the seat vacated by Judge Harry Pregerson, who assumed senior status on December 11, 2015. On July 13, 2016, a hearing on her nomination was held before the Senate Judiciary Committee. On September 15, her nomination was reported out of committee by a 13–7 vote, but the Senate did not act upon her nomination, and it expired on January 3, 2017, at the end of the 114th Congress. President Donald Trump nominated Daniel P. Collins to that seat on February 6, 2019, and he was confirmed on May 21.

==== Renomination to court of appeals under Biden ====
On September 8, 2021, President Joe Biden announced his intention to renominate Koh to serve as a United States circuit judge for the Ninth Circuit. On September 20, her nomination was sent to the Senate. Biden nominated Koh to the seat to be vacated by Judge Richard Paez, who had announced his intent to assume senior status upon confirmation of a successor. Koh was unanimously rated "well qualified" for the circuit judgeship by the American Bar Association's Standing Committee on the Federal Judiciary.

On October 6, 2021, the Senate Judiciary Committee held a confirmation hearing on her nomination. During her hearing, Republican senators criticized Koh for her ruling in the Tandon case. At least one Republican senator accused her of hostility to people of faith; Koh noted that she is a person of faith. Another Republican senator, Tom Cotton, suggested that Koh should have disregarded circuit precedent in the Tandon case; Koh responded that she was bound to follow higher court precedents. Democrats defended Koh, and her nomination was also supported by former California Governor Arnold Schwarzenegger, a Republican who appointed Koh to the state court earlier in her career. California Senator Alex Padilla criticized Republicans' attacks on Koh and other Biden judicial nominees, suggesting that they had singled out nonwhite judicial nominees for disparaging treatment. On October 28, Koh's nomination was favorably reported by the committee by a 13–9 vote.

On December 7, 2021, Majority Leader Chuck Schumer filed cloture on Koh's nomination. On December 9, the Senate invoked cloture on her nomination by a 51–38 vote. On December 13, Koh was confirmed by a 50–45 vote and she received her judicial commission on December 14. Koh is the first Korean-American woman to serve as a federal appellate judge and the second Asian Pacific American woman to serve on the Ninth Circuit from California, after Jacqueline Nguyen.

==== Cases as a circuit judge ====
On November 13, 2023, Koh was in a 7-4 majority that temporarily blocked Idaho's abortion ban due to its lack of exceptions for medical emergencies. On January 5, 2024, the Supreme Court said it would take up the case and dissolved the 9th Circuit's temporary injunction. On June 27, 2024, the Supreme Court dissolved the stay in Moyle v. United States, reinstating the 9th circuit's injunction against the ban.

On January 11, 2024, Koh struck down a San Francisco ordinance that prohibited homeless people from "sleeping, lodging or camping on public property".

On May 14, 2025, Koh upheld a federal district court's order blocking the Trump administration from cutting legal aid funding for migrants. In October 2025, Koh and William A. Fletcher wrote a concurring opinion when the full 9th circuit declined to visit their previous ruling.

== Personal life ==
Koh is married to Mariano-Florentino Cuéllar, the former president of the Carnegie Endowment for International Peace and a former justice of the California Supreme Court and professor at Stanford Law School. They have two children.

== See also ==
- List of Asian American jurists
- List of first women lawyers and judges in California
- List of first women lawyers and judges in the United States
- Hillary Clinton Supreme Court candidates
- Joe Biden judicial appointment controversies
- Joe Biden Supreme Court candidates

Legal offices
| Preceded by Ronald M. Whyte | Judge of the United States District Court for the Northern District of California; 2010–2021 | Succeeded by P. Casey Pitts |
| Preceded by Richard Paez | Judge of the United States Court of Appeals for the Ninth Circuit; 2021–present | Incumbent |
