= Samuel L. Williams =

Samuel L. Williams (ca. 1933–1994) was an American attorney who served as president of the Los Angeles Board of Police Commissioners, president of the Los Angeles County Bar Association in 1977, and the first African-American president of the State Bar of California (1981).

He was a senior partner at the law firm of Hufstedler & Kaus, retiring in 1990. Williams had been president of the National Conference of Bar Presidents. He was a staff attorney for the McCone Commission, which investigated the 1965 Watts riots and was on the Police Commission when it voted to suspend Chief Daryl F. Gates in the aftermath of the Rodney G. King beating.

Williams was on the board of the Walt Disney Company, the Bank of California, the Los Angeles Music Center and the University of Southern California, from which he had graduated.

He earned the Maynard Toll Award for lifetime service to the Los Angeles Legal Aid Foundation and the Shattuck-Price Award from the Los Angeles County Bar Association.

He died of a heart attack on July 28, 1994, and was survived by his wife, Beverly, a son and a daughter.

== See also ==
- Membership discrimination in California social clubs
