= P. Casey Pitts =

American judge (born 1980)

Casey Pitts
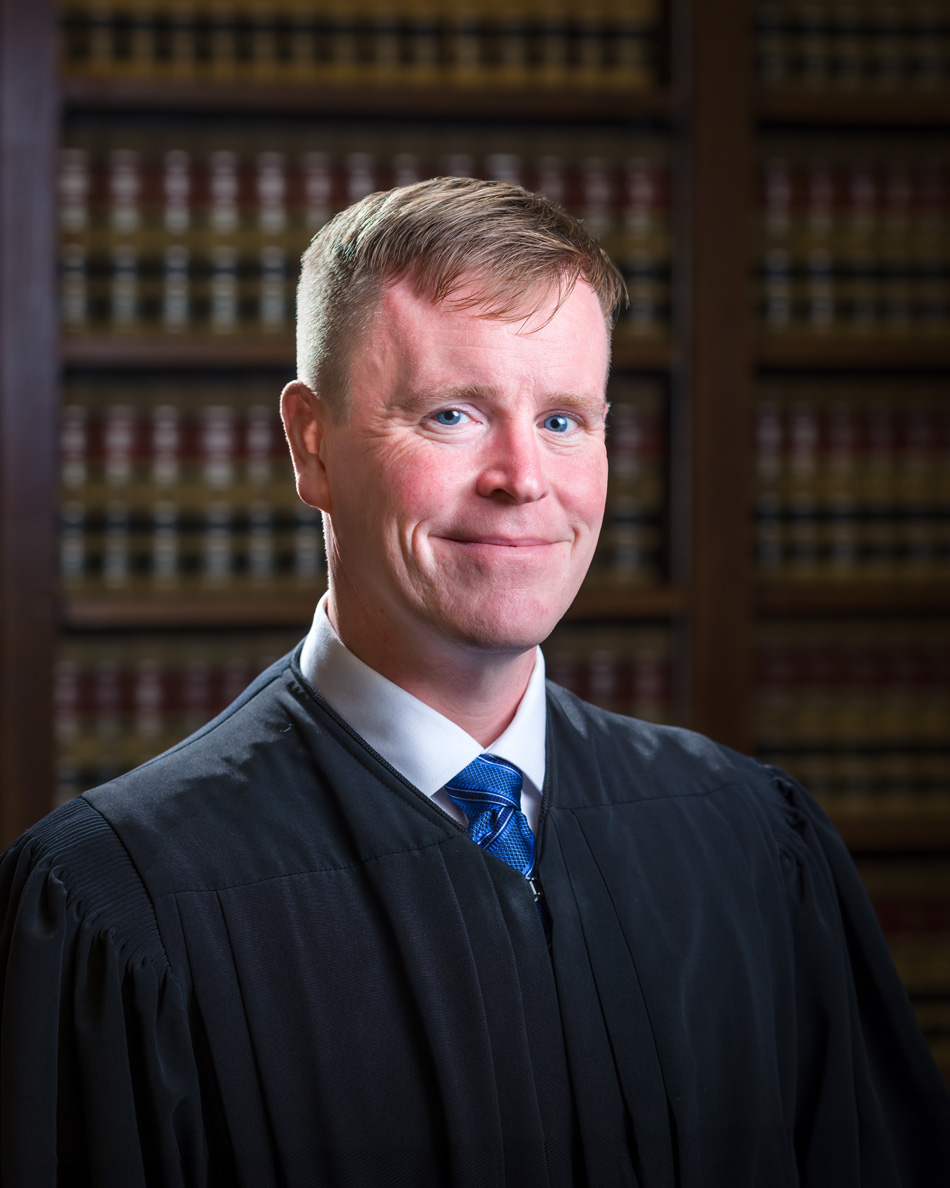

Judge of the United States District Court for the Northern District of California
- Incumbent
- Assumed office July 7, 2023
- Appointed by: Joe Biden
- Preceded by: Lucy Koh

Personal details
- Born: Patrick Casey Pitts; 1980 (age 45–46) Moorhead, Minnesota, U.S.
- Education: Yale University (BA, JD)

Patrick Casey Pitts (born 1980) is an American lawyer from California who is serving as a United States district judge of the United States District Court for the Northern District of California.

== Education ==
A native of Fargo, North Dakota, Pitts graduated from Fargo South High School. Pitts received a Bachelor of Arts from Yale University in 2003 and a Juris Doctor from Yale Law School in 2008. While in law school, he was a director of the Rebellious Lawyering Conference, managing editor of the Yale Journal of Law and Feminism, and a senior editor of the Yale Law Journal.

== Career ==
Pitts served as a law clerk for Judge Stephen Reinhardt of the United States Court of Appeals for the Ninth Circuit from 2008 to 2009. He was a partner at Altshuler Berzon LLP in San Francisco, California, where he worked from 2009 to 2023. Pitts was an associate at the firm from 2009 to 2017.

=== Notable cases ===
In 2010, Pitts was part of the legal team that represented the United Teachers Los Angeles in Reed v. United Teachers Los Angeles. The case involved the Education Code and the collective bargaining agreement between the district and its teachers, which generally requires that when the district reduces its teaching force for budgetary reasons, lay-offs must be based on seniority. In the summer of 2009, the district faced a budget shortfall and implemented a reduction in force (RIF) and laid-off temporary and probationary teachers. Other schools in the district did not suffer the same fate. For the 2009–2010 school year, vacancies at the Three Schools were filled with substitute teachers. In the spring of 2010, the district again faced a budget shortfall. It proposed a second RIF that would include permanent as well as probationary teachers.

In 2013, Pitts, Altshuler Berzon, Stephen Berzon and Scott Kronland represented the United Food and Commercial Workers Union Local 8. They filed an amicus curiae against plaintiff Ralphs Grocery Company. Beginning in October 2008, non-employee representatives of respondent, defendant United Food and Commercial Workers Union Local 8, began an informational picket line in front of the Foods Co store. Allegations included the picketing involved carrying placards, distributing leaflets, and attempting to engage Foods Co shoppers in conversations to inform them that Foods Co workers did not receive the benefits they would under a union contract. In addition, there were allegations of confrontations between picketers and store employees and of occasional aggressive efforts by picketers to give handbills to customers who were not willing to receive them. Alleging that the picketers refused to obey the rules appellant had established for presence on the property, and alleging that the police department was unwilling to remove the picketers from the property, appellant filed a complaint in February 2009 for declaratory and injunctive relief and for damages arising from respondent's picketers' continued presence.

In 2015, Pitts was part of the legal team that represented Tristan Broussard. Broussard is a transgender man who was employed with First Tower Loan, LLC, a consumer loan company, headquartered in Mississippi, with branches in five states, including Louisiana. Broussard's employment was terminated by the company.

In 2020, Pitts was part of the legal team that represented the defendant union in Jenni Chambers' case against the American Federation of State, County, and Municipal Employees International Union. The plaintiffs were public employees in Oregon, while the defendants were unions or their affiliates that exclusively represent Plaintiffs in the public workplace. The unions negotiated collective bargaining agreements ("CBAs") with the plaintiffs' public employers. These CBAs established the terms and conditions of employment for the relevant bargaining units. Although the plaintiffs were not members of the unions, Oregon law had previously required plaintiffs to pay compulsory union fees, often by automatic deduction from plaintiffs' wages, to the unions as a condition of plaintiffs' public employment. In addition, certain provisions in plaintiffs' respective CBAs reinforced this obligation. Plaintiffs did not consent to paying these fees to the Unions.

=== Federal judicial service ===
On September 2, 2022, President Joe Biden announced his intent to nominate Pitts to serve as a United States district judge of the United States District Court for the Northern District of California. On September 6, 2022, his nomination was sent to the Senate. President Biden nominated Pitts to the seat vacated by Judge Lucy Koh, who was elevated to the United States Court of Appeals for the Ninth Circuit on December 15, 2021. On December 13, 2022, a hearing on his nomination was held before the Senate Judiciary Committee. On January 3, 2023, his nomination was returned to the President under Rule XXXI, Paragraph 6 of the United States Senate. He was renominated on January 23, 2023. On February 9, 2023, his nomination was reported out of committee by a 12–9 vote. On June 14, 2023, the Senate invoked cloture on his nomination by a 53–46 vote. Later that day, his nomination was confirmed by a 53–46 vote. He received his judicial commission on July 7, 2023. Pitts became the only LGBT Article III judge actively serving on the United States District Court for the Northern District of California.

=== Notable rulings ===
On December 24, 2025, Pitts blocked ICE from conducting immigration arrests in northern California courthouses, agreeing with plaintiffs that ICE's presence presented noncitizens with a "Hobson's choice" between attending mandatory court hearings and risking arrest by ICE or not attending and risking a removal order.

== See also ==
- List of LGBT jurists in the United States

Legal offices
Preceded by Lucy Koh	Judge of the United States District Court for the Northern District of California; 2023–present	Incumbent
