= King Banaian =

American politician

Member of the Minnesota House of Representatives from the 15B district
- In office January 4, 2011 – January 7, 2013
- Preceded by: Larry Haws
- Succeeded by: district redrawn

Personal details
- Party: Republican
- Spouse: Barbara
- Children: 2
- Education: St. Anselm College; Claremont Graduate University (MA, PhD)
- Profession: Economist, professor, legislator

King Banaian is a Minnesota politician and former member of the Minnesota House of Representatives who represented District 15B from 2011 to 2013. The district includes parts of Benton, Sherburne and Stearns counties in the north-central part of the state. A Republican, he is an economist and an economics professor at St. Cloud State University in St. Cloud.

Banaian was first elected to the House in 2010, defeating DFL nominee Carol Lewis by just 13 votes after a recount. He served on the Capital Investment, the Higher Education Policy and Finance, the Rules and Legislative Administration, and the State Government Finance committees. In the 2012 election, Banaian was defeated by Democrat Zach Dorholt.

Named after his grandmother, Lena King Cloutman, Banaian attended Claremont Graduate University in Claremont, California, receiving his M.A. and his Ph.D. in economics. He was a community board member of the United Way of Central Minnesota.
