= California Commission on Judicial Appointments =

The California Commission on Judicial Appointments is a body of the government of California established in its current form in 1979 that is responsible for reviewing and confirming justices appointed by the Governor of California to the Supreme Court of California and judges appointed by the Governor to the California Courts of Appeal. The commission consists of the Chief Justice, the Attorney General of California, and the state's senior presiding justice of the California Courts of Appeal. The senior Associate Justice fills the Chief Justice's spot on the commission when a new Chief Justice is nominated.

The Commission initially continued the evaluative role of its predecessor, the California Commission on Judicial Qualifications, and was first proposed for that purpose through a ballot proposition in the election of November 1960. In 1961, California Assemblyman John A. Busterud proposed to expand the power of the Commission to require its approval for the Governor to appoint judges, which was endorsed by Caspar Weinberger. A bill to that effect was introduced in 1963.

The Commission has been criticized by various groups since shortly after its creation. A 2012 study of court appointment systems found that the existence of the Commission increased the chances that a California governor would appoint justices with a different party affiliation from their own.
