= Stephen Lachs =

American lawyer and judge

Judge of the Los Angeles County Superior Court
- In office September 17, 1979 – October 3, 1999
- Appointed by: Jerry Brown

Personal details
- Born: Stephen Michael Lachs; September 1939 (age 87)
- Education: University of California, Los Angeles (B.A., LL.B.)

Stephen Michael Lachs (born September 1939) is an American lawyer and retired judge. Lachs served as a judge of the Los Angeles County Superior Court from 1979 to 1999. He was the first openly gay judge appointed in the United States and is thought to be the first openly gay judge appointed anywhere in the world.

== Early life and education ==
Lachs received a Bachelor of Arts from the University of California, Los Angeles in 1960 and a Bachelor of Laws from the University of California, Los Angeles School of Law in 1963.

== Judicial service ==
From 1975 to 1979, Lachs served as a commissioner of the Los Angeles County Superior Court. In 1979, Lachs received a judicial appointment to the Los Angeles County Superior Court from Jerry Brown, who was beginning his second term as Governor of California. Brown had completed his first term as governor without appointing any openly gay people to any position, but he cited the failed 1978 Briggs Initiative, which sought to ban homosexuals from working in California's public schools, for his increased support of gay rights. As the first openly gay judge serving in the world, Lachs inspired many people along the journey for gay rights.

Lachs retired from the bench on October 3, 1999.

== Michael Jackson custody dispute ==
After retiring from the bench, Lachs worked for Action Dispute Resolution Services, a private company that offers mediation services for civil disputes. In 1999, Lachs was hired as a private judge by singer Michael Jackson and his ex-wife Debbie Rowe to mediate their custody dispute. Lachs granted Rowe's 2001 request to terminate her parental rights, but subsequently reversed that decision during a 2005 hearing. In December 2005, Lachs recused himself from the case after being accused by Jackson's lawyers of bias against Jackson.

== See also ==
- List of LGBT jurists in the United States
