= You Chung Hong =

American lawyer

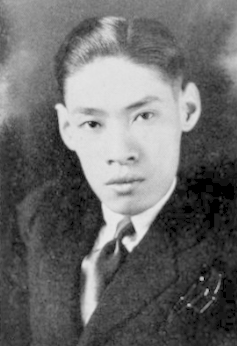
- Born: May 4, 1898; San Francisco, California, US
- Died: November 8, 1977 (aged 79); Los Angeles, California, US
- Burial place: Forest Lawn Memorial Park
- Education: University of Southern California
- Occupations: Attorney, Community leader
- Known for: Development of Los Angeles Chinatown

You Chung Hong (Chinese: 洪耀宗; pinyin: Hóng Yàozōng; May 4, 1898 – November 8, 1977) was an American attorney and community leader who was the second Chinese American lawyer admitted to practice law in the state of California, having passed the bar examination in 1923 before he became the first Chinese American graduate of the University of Southern California Law School. Chan Chung Wing was the first Chinese American to become a member of the California Bar in 1918. Hong played a major role in the development of Chinatown in Los Angeles, helping rebuild the community after it was relocated to accommodate the construction of Union Station in the 1930s.

== Biography ==
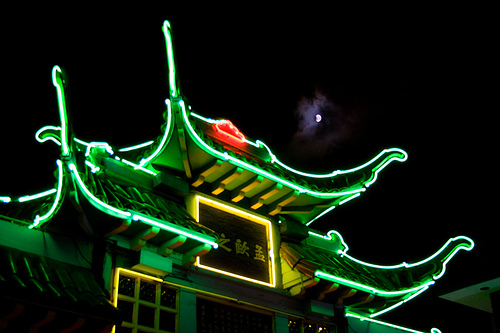
East Gate in New Chinatown Central Plaza, built in 1938 and designed by Hong, is Historic-Cultural Monument No. 826. West Gate is No. 825.

Hong was born on May 4, 1898, in San Francisco, California, his father a Chinese immigrant who had worked constructing railroads. He moved to Los Angeles after graduating from Lowell High School. There he worked as an interpreter for the United States Immigration and Naturalization Service and taught English to recent immigrants as a means to pay for his education. He graduated from the University of Southern California Law School in 1924 with a Bachelor of Laws degree in 1924 and a Master of Laws degree in 1925. He passed the bar on March 26, 1923, not yet having completed law school, making him the second Chinese American in California admitted to practice law in the state.

== Immigration law attorney ==
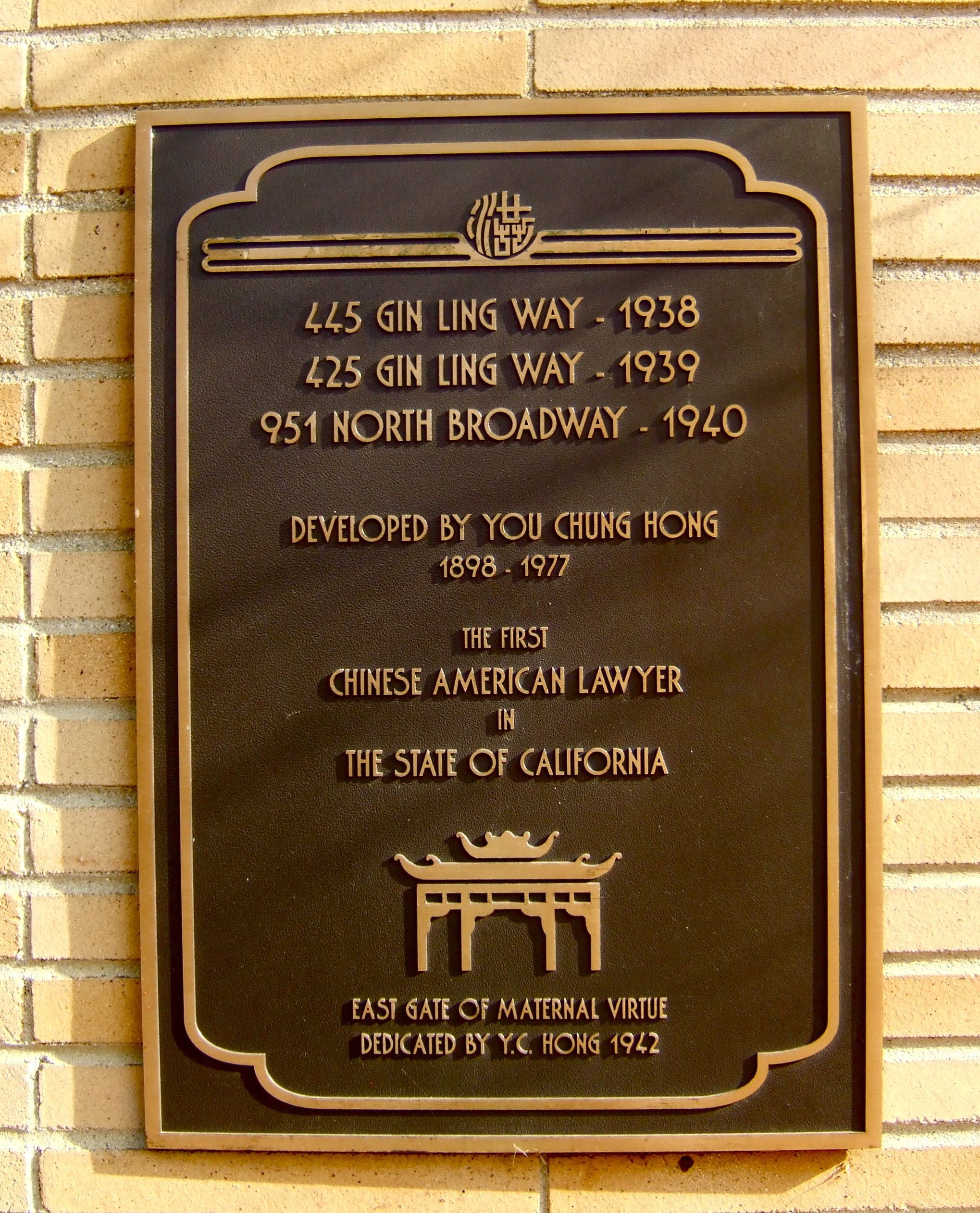
Memorial plaque for You Chung Hong in New Chinatown, Los Angeles, 2012

As an attorney, Hong worked to overturn the Chinese Exclusion Act of 1882, including testifying before the United States Senate on its effects. Hong became the first Chinese American to be eligible to appear before the Supreme Court of the United States when he was admitted in 1933. An active member of the local Chinese community, he was named president of the local chapter of the Chinese American Citizens Alliance when he was 28 years old.

The construction of Union Station in the 1930s involved the destruction of the city's existing Chinatown, and Hong played a pivotal role in developing its replacement, the first in the United States to be owned exclusively by its Chinese residents, both as an investor and in offering legal guidance. He designed a series of buildings on Gin Ling Way, one of which ultimately housed his legal office, and developed the main entrance gate on Broadway and its neon lighting.

His legal practice, the first in Los Angeles owned by a Chinese American, specialized in immigration law, and Hong became one of the top specialists in the field. Area residents approached him to assist with reunification with family members, such as the family of United States District Court Judge Ronald S.W. Lew.

Hong died in Los Angeles on November 8, 1977, and was buried at Forest Lawn Memorial Park.

After his death, his papers were donated to the Huntington Library, where the "Y.C. Hong: Advocate for Chinese-American Inclusion" exhibit was held on November 21, 2015, to March 22, 2016.
