= Ralph Moradian =

American lawyer, judge and editor (1906–1997)

Ralph Moradian (born Fresno, California 1906; died Fresno, California 1997) was a prominent lawyer, judge, and editor. He is known to be the first appointed judge in California of Armenian descent.

== Biography ==
Moradian graduated from Fresno High School. He then attended Fresno State College while working at the same time. Moradian's parents divorced in 1911; according to him, they were the first Armenian-American couple in Fresno to get a divorce. Before the divorce, Moradian's father, John Moradian, specialized in medicine and then moved to Chicago.

After graduating high school, Moradian served as a correspondent for The Fresno Evening Herald, The Fresno Morning Republican, and The San Francisco Chronicle. In 1934, without formal legal education, he became a lawyer. He was appointed Deputy District Attorney, becoming the first Armenian to hold a government position.

After leaving office, he engaged in private legal practice until 1963. In October 1963, Governor Edmund Brown appointed him to the Municipal Court, where he served until his retirement in 1976. From 1976 to 1991, he worked pro bono in the family court. After retiring for the second time, he edited the Fresno County Bar newsletter.

Moradian was the first Armenian to hold an official post in the state of California. He died in 1997.
