= Richard Paez =

American judge (born 1947)

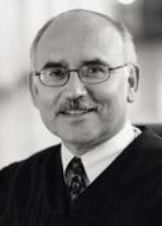

Senior Judge of the United States Court of Appeals for the Ninth Circuit
- Incumbent
- Assumed office December 13, 2021

Judge of the United States Court of Appeals for the Ninth Circuit
- In office March 14, 2000 – December 13, 2021
- Appointed by: Bill Clinton
- Preceded by: Cecil F. Poole
- Succeeded by: Lucy Koh

Judge of the United States District Court for the Central District of California
- In office June 16, 1994 – March 17, 2000
- Appointed by: Bill Clinton
- Preceded by: Seat established
- Succeeded by: S. James Otero

Personal details
- Born: Richard Anthony Paez; May 5, 1947 (age 79) Salt Lake City, Utah, U.S.
- Party: Democratic
- Education: Brigham Young University (BA); University of California, Berkeley (JD)

Richard Anthony Paez (born May 5, 1947) is a senior United States circuit judge of the United States Court of Appeals for the Ninth Circuit.

== Early life and education ==
Born in Salt Lake City, Utah, Paez received his Bachelor of Arts degree from Brigham Young University in 1969. He attended the UC Berkeley School of Law and graduated with a Juris Doctor in 1972.

== Career ==
Paez began his career as a staff attorney for California Rural Legal Assistance, from 1972 to 1974, then as a staff attorney for the Western Center on Law and Poverty, from 1974 to 1976. He joined the Legal Aid Foundation of Los Angeles in 1976 as senior counsel, was director of litigation from 1978 to 1979 and deputy director for litigation, from 1979 to 1980, then was acting executive director and director of litigation, from 1980 to 1981. Paez then became a judge of the Los Angeles Municipal Court from 1981 to 1994.

=== Federal judicial service ===
Following his March 9, 1994, nomination by President Bill Clinton, confirmation by the United States Senate on June 15, 1994, and reception of commission on June 16, 1994, Paez became the second Mexican American to sit on the bench of the United States District Court for the Central District of California, a district that covers Los Angeles. His service as a district court judge was terminated on March 17, 2000 when he was elevated to the court of appeals.

Paez was confirmed by Senate on March 9, 2000 by a 59-39 vote, more than four years after President Clinton first nominated him to the United States Court of Appeals for the Ninth Circuit. Paez waited 1,506 days to be confirmed, which at that time was the longest wait for a vote by any judicial nominee in U.S. history. The campaign against Paez's confirmation was led by Senators Robert C. Smith of New Hampshire and Jeff Sessions of Alabama over assertions that Paez and other Ninth Circuit judges were too liberal. Then Vice President Al Gore interrupted his campaign to fly back to Washington to preside over the confirmation vote. He received his commission on March 14, 2000. On May 10, 2021, he announced his intent to assume senior status upon confirmation of a successor. He assumed senior status on December 13, 2021.

== Notable cases ==
On August 6, 2004, Paez ruled that Maricopa County Sheriff Joe Arpaio's internet broadcasting of pretrial detainees violated the 14th Amendment. He wrote: "We fail to see how turning pretrial detainees into the unwilling objects of the latest reality show serves any... legitimate goals... Inmates are not like animals in a zoo to be filmed and photographed at will..."

Paez authored the ruling in Bolt v. United States, which was filed on December 3, 2007. In April 1999, Carol Bolt had fallen on snow and ice in the parking lot of an Army apartment complex and broken her ankle. Paez ruled that the Army could not use the "discretionary function exception" as a defense because it failed to clear the parking area in one of its apartment complexes despite specifying a duty to do so "once a year, before the end of March".

In a 2009 decision, he held that a San Francisco resolution urging the Vatican to withdraw a directive against gay adoptions does not violate the Establishment Clause.

In a 2011 decision, he wrote the majority opinion upholding a lower court's blocking of the most controversial parts of the Arizona SB 1070 anti-illegal immigration law from taking effect.

Also in 2011, in Mattos v. Argarano, Paez wrote the majority opinion ruling that police officers tasing a domestic violence victim who happens to be standing between the officers and her abuser violates the 4th amendment.

On May 3, 2019, Paez concurred in a 9th Circuit en banc decision holding that an immigration judge erred by failing to inform a 14-year old immigrant that he might be eligible for a form of relief from removal, temporarily halting his deportation to Honduras. However, Paez went further than the majority. Paez would have ruled that the 5th Amendment's Due Process Clause guarantees the right to appointed counsel for minors in most removal proceedings, an issue the majority declined to reach. Paez's concurrence was joined by Judges Marsha Berzon and William A. Fletcher.

On February 24, 2020, Paez strongly dissented when the 9th Circuit upheld Trump's "Global Gag Rule" by a vote of 7 to 4. Paez's dissent was joined by Chief Judge Thomas, Judges Wardlaw and Fletcher. Paez also claimed that the majority was kowtowing towards the Trump administration, and he called the decision "paternalistic" and partisan.

Paez dissented in the Americans with Disabilities Act lawsuit, D.D. v. LAUSD, decided November 19, 2021. Paez argued that forcing the plaintiffs to go through the entire litigation process would not be helpful. He wrote "The majority has unduly burdened students with disabilities with having to proceed with a full hearing at the administrative level for claims that do not implicate a FAPE simply because the discrimination they suffer happens at school." The decision was 6-5 on unusual lines; the 5 dissenters were Paez, 2 other liberals, and 2 textualist conservatives (who wrote their own dissenting opinion).

On February 4, 2022, Paez dissented from an opinion by Judge Milan Smith determining that former United States Secretary of Education Elisabeth DeVos could not be forced to sit for a deposition in a case arising out of delays in making decisions on student loans. Paez emphasized that because DeVos was only a former cabinet secretary, ordinary concerns about disrupting an executive official's duties were not present. Paez also said that the majority decision did not give a good reason for revisiting the trial court's "holistic assessment of the record."

== See also ==
- List of Hispanic and Latino American jurists

== Sources ==
Legal offices
New seat	Judge of the United States District Court for the Central District of California; 1994–2000	Succeeded by S. James Otero
Preceded by Cecil F. Poole	Judge of the United States Court of Appeals for the Ninth Circuit; 2000–2021	Succeeded by Lucy Koh
