= Simon Marootian =

American political activist (1923 - 1980)

Simon Marootian (1923 - 1980) was a political activist and a Superior Court Judge of Fresno County. He became the first Superior Court Judge of Fresno County of Armenian descent.

== Life and career ==
Simon Marootian served as Supreme Court Judge of Fresno county from 1975 to 1980. He was also a local and statewide Democratic Party political activist. He was the chairman of the Fresno County Democratic Central Committee. In 1974 he became the Co-Chairman of Edmund Pat Brown campaign to become governor of California. He was also the chairman of the parish council of the St. Gregory Apostolic Church in Fowler, California.

He died in 1980 at the age of fifty-seven.
