= R. C. O. Benjamin =

American journalist (1855–1900)

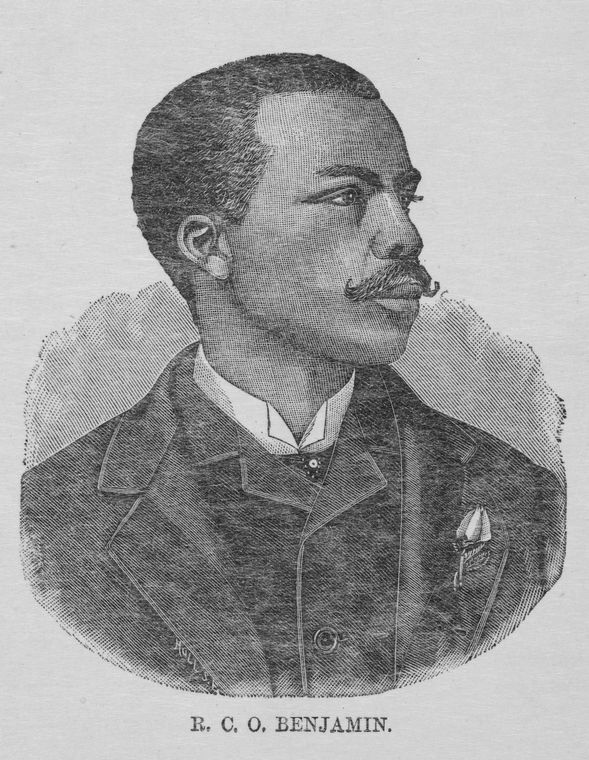
- Benjamin in 1887
- Born: Robert Charles O'Hara Benjamin; March 31, 1855; St. Kitts, British Leeward Islands
- Died: October 2, 1900; Lexington, Kentucky, United States
- Cause of death: Murder
- Occupations: Journalist, lawyer, minister
- Political party: Republican

Religious life
- Religion: African Methodist Episcopal

R. C. O. Benjamin (né Robert Charles O'Hara Benjamin; March 31, 1855 – October 2, 1900) was a West Indies-born American journalist, lawyer, and minister. He was an editor or contributor to numerous newspapers throughout the country, and may have been the first black editor of a white paper when he became editor of the Daily Sun In Los Angeles, California. He was also possibly the first black man admitted to the California bar, and may have been admitted to the bar in twelve states. In 1900 he was working as a prominent lawyer in Lexington, Kentucky when he was beaten for helping register black voters by a white man who opposed his efforts. Later that day he was killed by the same man.

== Early life and education ==
Robert Charles O'Hara Benjamin was born in St. Kitts on March 31, 1855. He attended compulsory schools until the age of eleven when he was sent to England for private tutoring, and then enrolled in Trinity College, Oxford University where he studied for three years. He left Oxford without receiving a degree and made a two-year tour of the East Indies including Sumatra and Java. After returning to England, he sailed to New York City, arriving April 13, 1869. Ten days later he took a six-month cruise to South America and the Caribbean as a cabin boy on the Lepanto captained by Cyrus E. Staples. The tour stopped in Venezuela, Curaçao, Demerara, and the West Indies. In the fall of 1869 he returned and settled in New York City.

== Early career ==
In New York he became associated with Henry Highland Garnet, Cornelius Vancott, Isaac Hayes, and Joe Howard, Jr. He took work as a soliciting agent for the paper, the New York Star, where Howard was an editor. In this position, he befriended J. J. Freeman, editor of the Progressive American, and Benjamin was made city editor of that paper. Around this time he was naturalized as a US citizen.

In 1876, he campaigned for Republican Party presidential candidate Rutherford B. Hayes, who would win. As a result of his political efforts, Benjamin was appointed letter carrier in the New York Post office. After nine months, he resigned and moved to Kentucky where he worked as a school teacher in various places and began studying law. Among his tutors were ex-Congressman Reed and Kentucky politician Dave Smith. He then moved to Decatur, Alabama where he became principal of a public school, and then to Brinkley, Arkansas and finally Memphis, Tennessee. In Memphis, he continued to study law, now under Josiah Patterson. With Patterson's help, he was admitted to the bar in January 1880. He was also admitted to the bar in Charlottesville, Virginia in the 1880s.

== Journalist, writer, and orator ==
He returned to journalism, and owned and edited a number of papers throughout the country, including the Colored Citizen in Pittsburgh, Pennsylvania, the Chronicle in Evansville, Indiana, and the Negro American in Birmingham, Alabama, where he settled for some time. In Birmingham 1887, together with A. L. Scott, Samuel Roebuck, George Turner, J. H. Thompson, Sandy Goodloe, D. A. Williams, A. T. Walker, William R. Pettiford, and J. T. Jones he incorporated the Robert Brown Elliot School of Technology in Birmingham, the first school of its kind for blacks in the U.S. He also was a pamphlet writer, writing pamphlets on African-American history and issues. Further, he was a noted orator and often spoke out against lynchings and violence against blacks. For his outspokenness, Benjamin was forced to leave Brinkley, Arkansas in 1879 and Birmingham in 1887.

He was also noted as a poet, and his work was published in an anthology of nineteenth century African American poetry in 1992.

== California ==
In 1887, Benjamin moved to California where he was an editor for the Los Angeles Observer and the San Francisco Sentinel. He was for some time the local editor of the Daily Sun In Los Angeles. The Sun was a white paper, and Benjamin may have been the first black man to edit a white journal. In California, he became the first black man admitted to the bar in 1887. He practiced in San Francisco and may have been the first black lawyer to visit Oregon. Benjamin is claimed to have been admitted to the bar in 12 states, including Virginia, Tennessee, California, Rhode Island, and Alabama.

== Later career and death ==
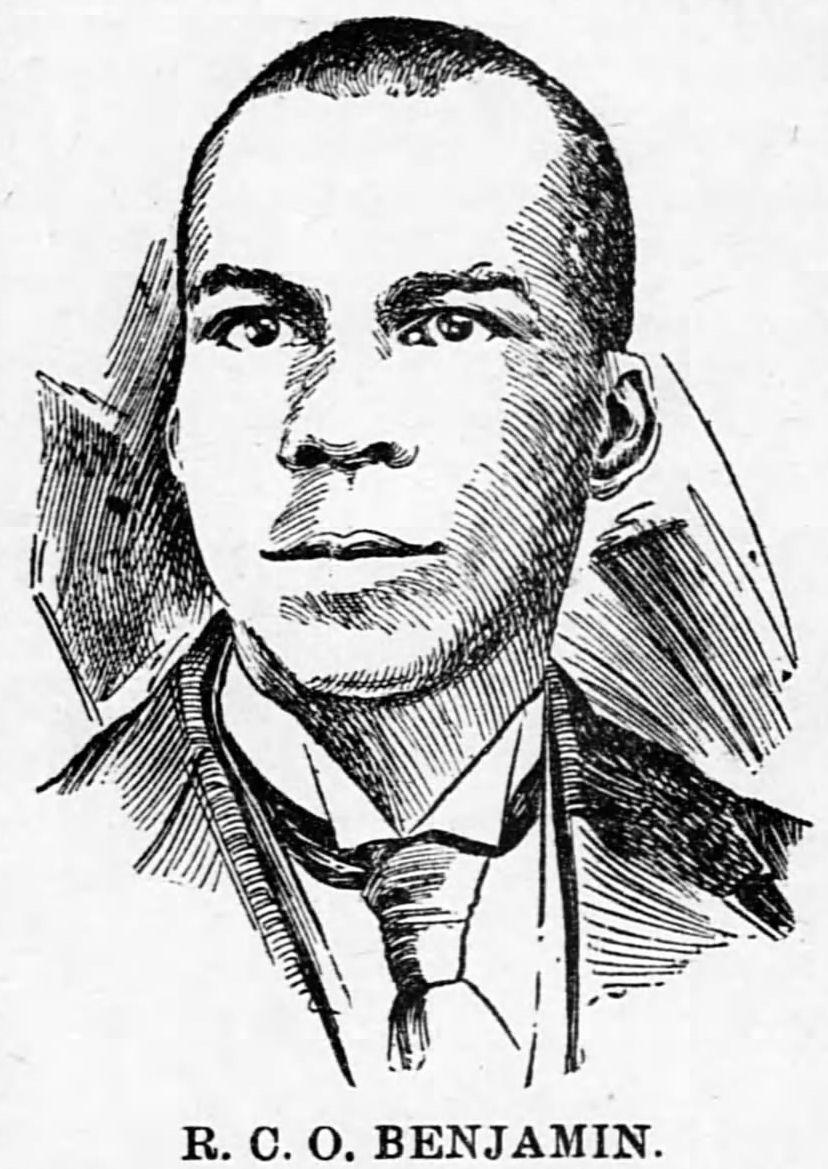
Benjamin from his 1900 obituary in the Colored American

In December 1892, Benjamin married Lula M. Robinson. They had a son and a daughter. In 1895, while practicing law in Rhode Island, Benjamin, who was ordained in the African Methodist Episcopal Church, was nominated to the position of chaplain of the United States House of Representatives. In 1897, Benjamin, his wife, Lula, and their two children he returned to Lexington, Kentucky where he edited the Lexington Standard. In 1900, he was an attorney for Caleb Powers and Richard "Tallow Dick" Combes in the assassination of governor-elect William Goebel.

=== Murder ===
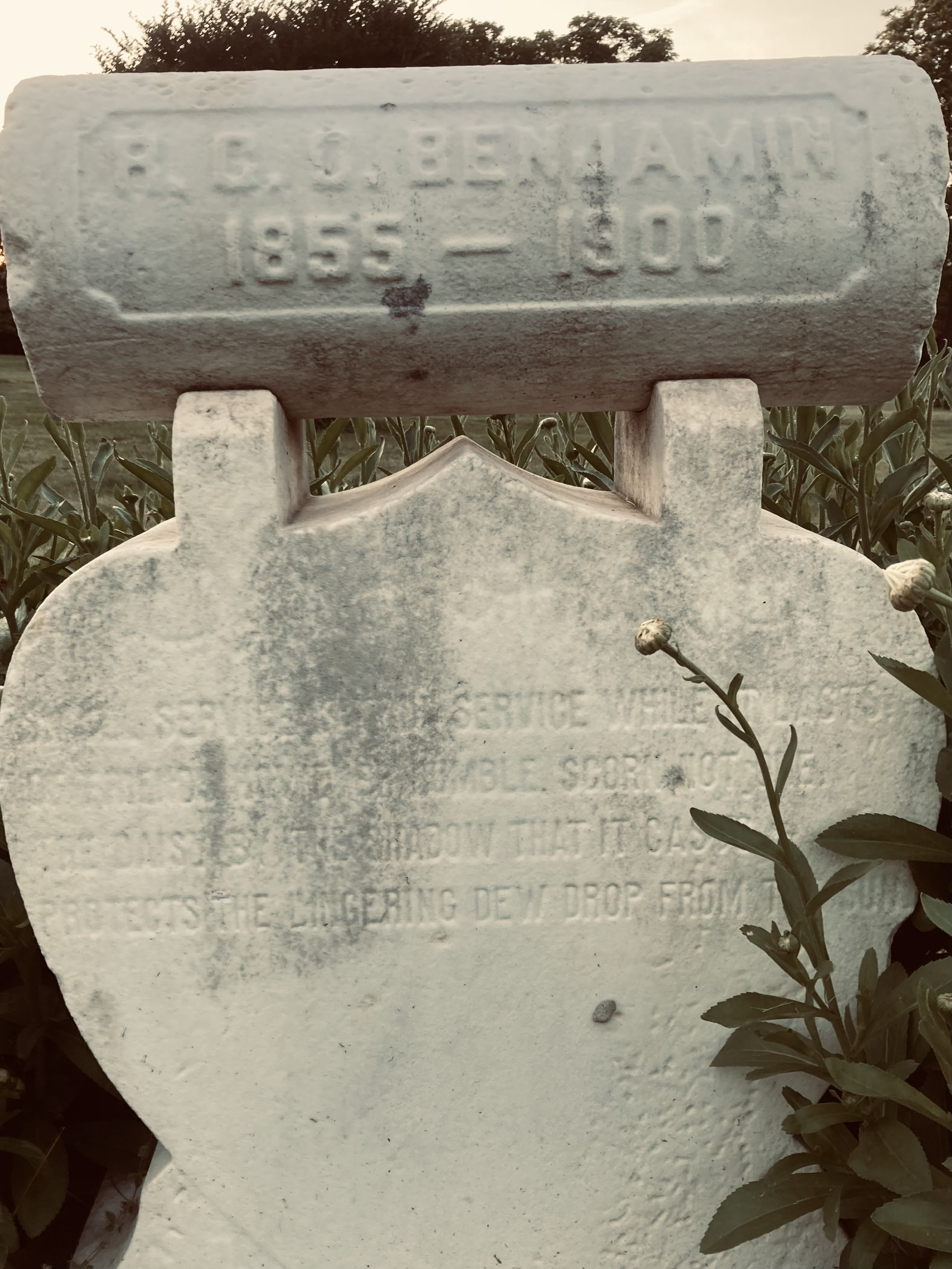
Monument honoring Benjamin at African Cemetery No. 2, dedicated in 1910 ten years after his murder

On October 2, 1900, Benjamin was murdered while helping to register blacks to vote in Lexington. That day he chastised a white man, Michael Moynahan, for harassing a group of black men registering to vote. Moynahan beat Benjamin with a revolver, and was then arrested for assault. When Moynahan was released from jail that evening, he went to Benjamin's house and awaited his return. When Benjamin returned and saw Moynahan, he turned to run. Moynahan then shot Benjamin in the back six times. At his trial, Moynahan pleaded not-guilty for reasons of self defense and the case was dismissed.

His life in Lexington is the subject of historic fiction told in first person narratives in the novel A Wounded Snake by Joseph G. Anthony.

Benjamin was buried in Lexington's African Cemetery No. 2. In 1910, a monument was dedicated at his grave site.

== Publications ==
- Benjamin, R. C. O. Poetic gems, Peck & Allan, (Charlottesville, Va.) 1883.
- Benjamin, R. C. O. Life of Toussaint L'Ouverture: Warrior and Statesman, with an Historical Survey of the Island of San Domingo from the Discovery of the Island by Christopher Columbus, in 1492, to the Death of Toussaint, in 1803. Vol. 1. Evening Express Print Company, 1888.
- Benjamin, R. C. O. Don't : a book for girls. Valleau & Peterson, Book and Job Printers, (San Francisco), 1891.
- Benjamin, R. C. O. The negro problem : and the method of its solution, an address delivered at the A.M.E. Zion Church, Portland, Oregon, June 3d, 1891. George E. Watkins Souvenir and Directory Publishing Co., (San Francisco) 1891.
- Benjamin, R. C. O. Southern outrages; a statistical record of lawless doings. (Los Angeles, Cal.), 1894
- Benjamin, R. C. O. Benjamin's pocket history of the American Negro : a story of thirty-one years, from 1863 to 1894. Marion Trint, (Providence, RI) 1894.
- Benjamin, R. C. O. Light after darkness : being an up-to-date history of the American Negro. Daniel Murray Pamphlet Collection (Library of Congress), Marshall & Beveridge, Printers, (Xenia, Ohio), 1896.

== See also ==
- List of first minority male lawyers and judges in California

== Sources ==
- Smith Jr, J. Clay. Emancipation: The Making of the Black Lawyer, 1844–1944. University of Pennsylvania Press, 1999.
