= Scott Hershovitz =

American philosopher

- Title: Thomas G. and Mabel Long Professor of Law at the University of Michigan Law School
- Board member of: Legal Theory

Academic background
- Education: University of Georgia (BA, MA) University of Oxford (PhD) Yale University (JD)
- Doctoral advisor: Joseph Raz

Academic work
- Discipline: Philosophy of Law
- Institutions: University of Michigan
- Notable works: Nasty, Brutish, and Short: Adventures in Philosophy with Kids (2022) Law is a Moral Practice (2023)
- Website: scotthershovitz.com

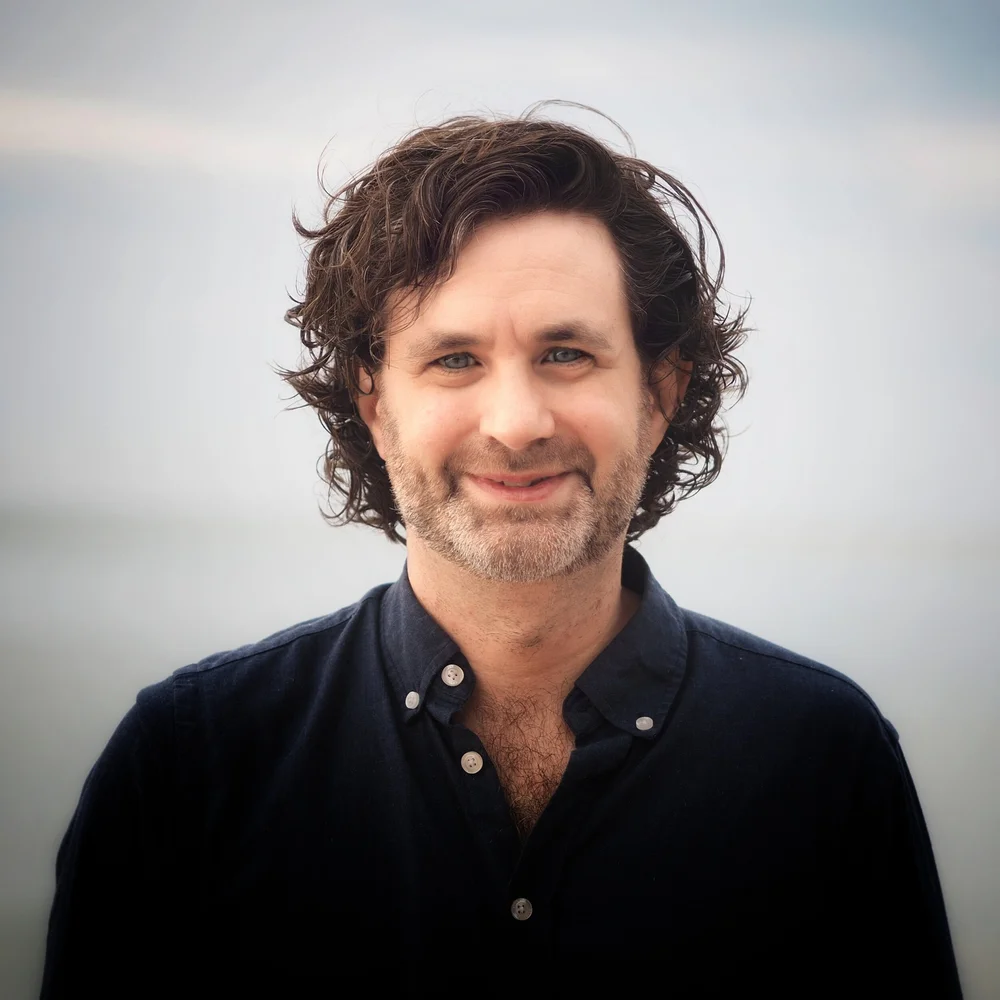
Image of Scott Hershovitz

Scott Hershovitz is an American philosopher of law who is the Thomas G. and Mabel Long Professor of Law at the University of Michigan as well as the Director for the Law and Ethics Program.. He is a co-editor of Legal Theory and has published two books: Nasty, Brutish, and Short: Adventures in Philosophy with Kids and Law Is a Moral Practice.

== Education ==
Hershovitz earned a J.D. at the Yale Law School, a D.Phil. at the University of Oxford, where he studied as a Rhodes Scholar, and a M.A. and A.B. at the University of Georgia.

== Career ==
After graduating from the Yale Law School, Hershovitz was a law for Judge William A. Fletcher of the United States Court of Appeals for the Ninth Circuit and Justice Ruth Bader Ginsburg of the United States Supreme Court. In between clerkships, Hershovitz spent a year serving as attorney-advisor on the appellate staff of the Civil Division of the United States Department of Justice.

Hershovitz was hired by the University of Michigan Law School in 2007 and received a joint appointment as a professor of philosophy in 2012.

His academic work primarily centers around tort law and the ways that damages do (and don’t) right wrongs. Hershovitz’s work draws on and continues much of the work done by philosopher Ronald Dworkin. His academic work has appeared in the Harvard Law Review, The Yale Law Journal, and Ethics, among other places.

In addition, he has written articles on philosophy for the New York Times and The Atlantic

== Books ==
In 2022, Hershovitz published Nasty, Brutish, and Short: Adventures in Philosophy with Kids with Penguin Press . In 2023, He published Law is a Moral Practice with Harvard University Press.
