= Holly A. Thomas =

American judge (born 1979)

Holly Thomas
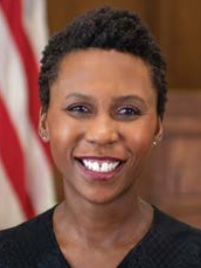

Judge of the United States Court of Appeals for the Ninth Circuit
- Incumbent
- Assumed office January 24, 2022
- Appointed by: Joe Biden
- Preceded by: William A. Fletcher

Judge of the Los Angeles County Superior Court
- In office November 29, 2018 – January 24, 2022
- Appointed by: Jerry Brown
- Preceded by: Robert Dukes
- Succeeded by: Pamela Dansby

Personal details
- Born: 1979 (age 46–47) San Diego, California, U.S.
- Party: Democratic
- Education: Stanford University (BA); Yale University (JD)

Holly Aiyisha Thomas (born 1979) is an American attorney serving as a United States circuit judge of the United States Court of Appeals for the Ninth Circuit. She previously served as a judge of the Los Angeles County Superior Court from 2018 to 2022.

== Early life and education ==
Thomas was born in San Diego. Thomas' father was a bookkeeper and her mother was a school custodian, neither of whom went to college. She graduated from Stanford University in 2000 with a Bachelor of Arts degree with honors. Thomas worked as a client advocate for the San Francisco Bar Association's Volunteer Legal Services Program from 2000 to 2001. She then attended Yale Law School, where she was an essays editor for the Yale Law Journal, graduating with a Juris Doctor in 2004.

== Career ==
Thomas served as a law clerk for judge Kim McLane Wardlaw of the United States Court of Appeals for the Ninth Circuit from 2004 to 2005. From 2005 to 2010, Thomas worked as an assistant counsel at the NAACP Legal Defense and Educational Fund, where she was a Liman Fellow from 2005 to 2006. From 2010 to 2015, she was an appellate attorney in the United States Department of Justice Civil Rights Division and from 2015 to 2016, Thomas was a special counsel to the solicitor general of New York. During her tenure as special counsel to the solicitor general of New York, Thomas filed briefs in federal district courts in North Carolina and Texas. The briefs challenged North Carolina's Public Facilities Privacy & Security Act, which compelled public facilities containing single-gender washrooms to only allow people of the corresponding sex as listed on their birth certificate to use them. From 2016 to 2018, she served as deputy director of executive programs at the California Department of Fair Employment and Housing. In November 2018, California Governor Jerry Brown appointed Thomas to be a judge of the Los Angeles County Superior Court. Her service on the state court terminated once she was elevated to the Ninth Circuit Court.

=== Federal judicial service ===
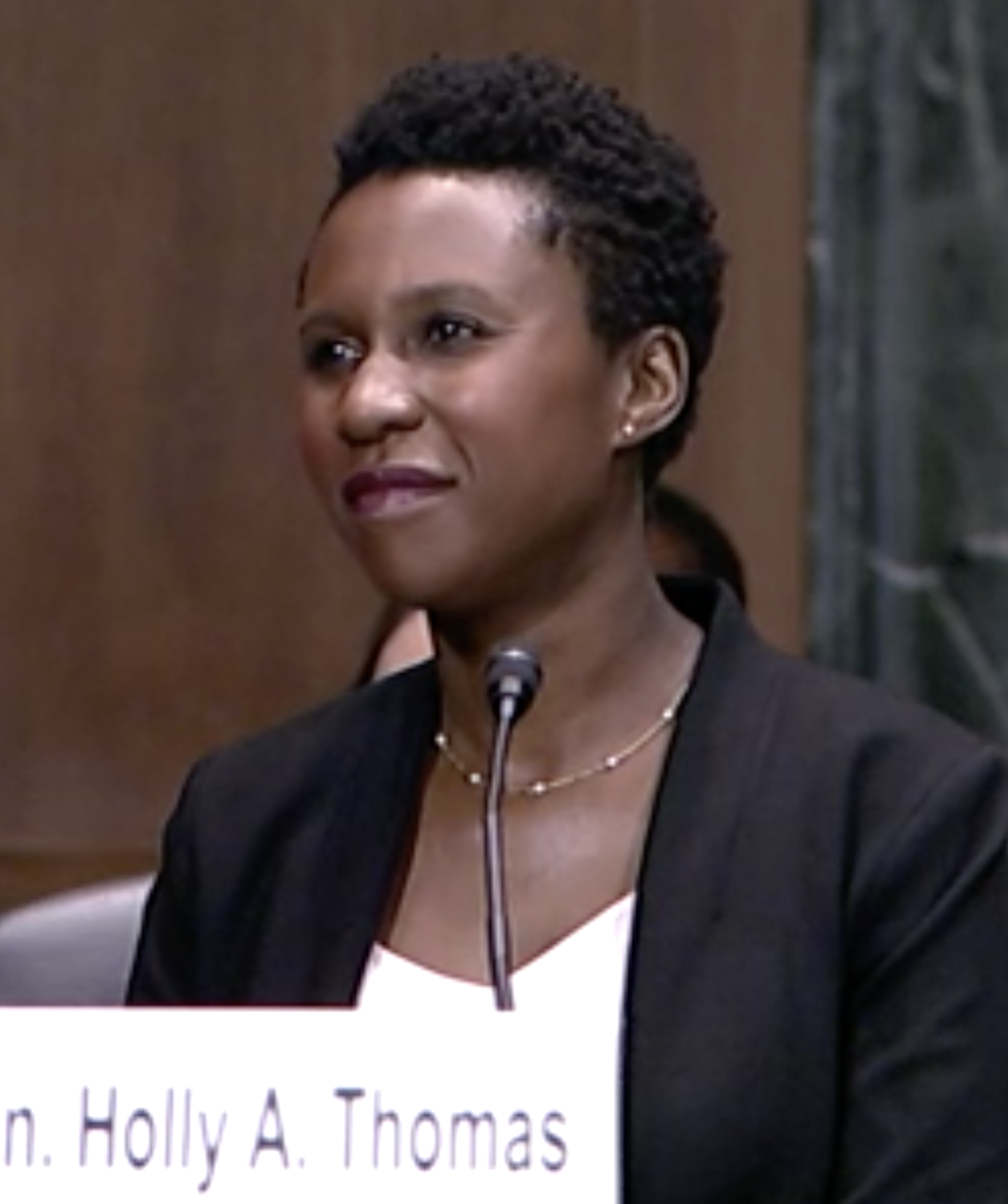
Thomas testifying before the Senate Judiciary Committee

On September 8, 2021, President Joe Biden announced his intent to nominate Thomas to serve as a United States circuit judge for the United States Court of Appeals for the Ninth Circuit. On September 20, 2021, her nomination was sent to the Senate. President Biden nominated Thomas to the seat to be vacated by Judge William A. Fletcher, who announced his intent to assume senior status upon confirmation of a successor. On October 20, 2021, a hearing on her nomination was held before the Senate Judiciary Committee. During her confirmation hearing, Republican senators criticized her work as a civil rights attorney before becoming a Superior Court judge. On December 2, 2021, the Senate Judiciary Committee failed to report her nomination by a 11–11 vote. On December 16, 2021, the United States Senate discharged the committee from further consideration of her nomination by a 50–46 vote. On December 17, 2021, Majority Leader Chuck Schumer filed cloture on her nomination. On December 18, 2021, the Senate invoked cloture on her nomination by a 42–25 vote. On January 20, 2022, her nomination was confirmed by a 48–40 vote. She received her judicial commission on January 24, 2022. Thomas became the first black woman to serve on the Ninth Circuit from California, as well as the second black woman to ever serve on the Ninth Circuit after Johnnie B. Rawlinson.

On January 27, 2022, following Justice Stephen Breyer's announcement of his intention to retire as an Associate Justice of the United States Supreme Court, Thomas was mentioned as one of the potential nominees for a Supreme Court appointment by President Joe Biden.

== See also ==
- Joe Biden Supreme Court candidates
- List of African American federal judges
- List of African American jurists

Legal offices
Preceded by William A. Fletcher	Judge of the United States Court of Appeals for the Ninth Circuit; 2022–present	Incumbent
