= Garcetti v. Ceballos =

- Supreme Court of the United States

Argued October 12, 2005 Reargued March 21, 2006 Decided May 30, 2006
- Full case name: Gil Garcetti, Frank Sundstedt, Carol Najera, and County of Los Angeles v. Richard Ceballos
- Docket no.: 04-473
- Citations: 547 U.S. 410 (more) 126 S. Ct. 1951; 164 L. Ed. 2d 689; 2006 U.S. LEXIS 4341; 74 U.S.L.W. 4257; 152 Lab. Cas. (CCH) ¶ 60,203; 87 Empl. Prac. Dec. (CCH) ¶ 42,353; 24 I.E.R. Cas. (BNA) 737
- Argument: Oral argument

Case history
- Prior: Summary judgment granted to defendants, Ceballos v. Garcetti, No. 00-cv-11106, 2002 WL 34098285 (C.D. Cal. January 30, 2002); reversed, 361 F.3d 1168 (9th Cir. 2004); cert. granted, 543 U.S. 1186 (2005).

Holding
- Statements made by public employees pursuant to their official duties are not protected by the First Amendment from employer discipline.

Court membership
- Chief Justice John Roberts Associate Justices John P. Stevens · Antonin Scalia; Anthony Kennedy · David Souter; Clarence Thomas · Ruth Bader Ginsburg; Stephen Breyer · Samuel Alito

Case opinions
- Majority: Kennedy, joined by Roberts, Scalia, Thomas, Alito
- Dissent: Stevens
- Dissent: Souter, joined by Stevens, Ginsburg
- Dissent: Breyer

Laws applied
- U.S. Const. amend. I

Garcetti v. Ceballos, 547 U.S. 410 (2006), is a U.S. Supreme Court decision involving First Amendment free speech protections for government employees. The plaintiff in the case was a district attorney who claimed that he had been passed up for a promotion for criticizing the legitimacy of a warrant. The Court ruled, in a 5–4 decision, that because his statements were made pursuant to his position as a public employee, rather than as a private citizen, his speech had no First Amendment protection.

== Background ==
Richard Ceballos had been employed since 1989 as a deputy district attorney for the Los Angeles County District Attorney's Office, which at the time was headed by Gil Garcetti. After the defense attorney in a pending criminal case contacted Ceballos about his motion to challenge a critical search warrant based on inaccuracies in the supporting affidavit, Ceballos conducted his own investigation and determined that the affidavit contained serious misrepresentations. Ceballos contacted the deputy sheriff who had sworn out the affidavit but was not satisfied by his explanations. Ceballos then communicated his findings to his supervisors and submitted a memorandum in which he recommended dismissal of the case. A meeting was subsequently held to discuss the affidavit with his superiors and officials from the sheriff's department, which Ceballos claimed became heated and accusatory of his role in handling the case. Despite Ceballos' concerns, his supervisor decided to proceed with the prosecution. The criminal trial court held a hearing on the motion, during which Ceballos was called by the defense to recount his observations about the affidavit. The trial court nevertheless denied the motion and upheld the warrant.

Ceballos claimed that he was subsequently subjected to a series of retaliatory employment actions. These included reassignment to a different position, transfer to another courthouse, and denial of a promotion. He initiated an employment grievance, which was denied based on a finding that he had not suffered any retaliation.

=== District Court proceedings ===
Ceballos then brought a section 1983 claim in the United States District Court for the Central District of California, asserting that his supervisors violated the First Amendment by retaliating against him for his memo. His supervisors claimed that there was no retaliation, that the changes in his job were instead dictated by legitimate staffing concerns, and that regardless, Ceballos' memo was not constitutionally protected speech under the First Amendment. The District Court granted their motion for summary judgment, concluding that because Ceballos wrote his memo pursuant to the duties of his employment, he was not entitled to First Amendment protection for the memo's contents. In the alternative, it ruled that even if he had a protected speech right in this context, the right was not clearly established and so qualified immunity applied to his supervisors' actions.

=== Court of Appeals decision ===
On appeal, the U.S. Court of Appeals for the Ninth Circuit reversed, holding that his criticism of the warrant in the memo constituted protected speech under the First Amendment. The court applied the analysis set forth in Supreme Court precedent that looks to whether the expression at issue was made by the speaker "as a citizen upon matters of public concern." Because his memo dealt with what he thought to be governmental misconduct, the court believed its subject was "inherently a matter of public concern." However, the court did not evaluate whether it was made in Ceballos' capacity as a citizen because of Ninth Circuit precedent ruling that the First Amendment applied to statements made pursuant to a duty of employment.

Having concluded that Ceballos' memo satisfied the public-concern requirement, the Court of Appeals proceeded to balance Ceballos' interest in his speech against his supervisors' interest in responding to it. The court struck the balance in Ceballos' favor, noting that his supervisors had "failed even to suggest disruption or inefficiency in the workings of the District Attorney's Office" as a result of the memo. The court further concluded that Ceballos' First Amendment rights were clearly established and that petitioner's actions were not objectively reasonable.

Judge Diarmuid Fionntain O'Scannlain agreed that the panel's decision was compelled by Circuit precedent. He nevertheless concluded that the Circuit should be revisited and overruled: "when public employees speak in the course of carrying out their routine, required employment obligations, they have no personal interest in the content of that speech that gives rise to a First Amendment right."

== Opinion of the Court ==
The Supreme Court reversed the Ninth Circuit, ruling in a 5–4 decision delivered by Justice Anthony Kennedy that the First Amendment does not prevent employees from being disciplined for expressions they make pursuant to their professional duties. The case had been reargued following the retirement of Justice Sandra Day O'Connor, as the decision was tied without her; her successor, Justice Samuel Alito, then broke the tie.

The four dissenting justices, in three dissents written by Justices John Paul Stevens, David Souter, and Stephen Breyer, took issue with the majority's firm line against the First Amendment ever applying to speech made within the scope of public employment, arguing instead that the government's stronger interest in this context could be accommodated by the ordinary balancing test.

=== Kennedy's majority opinion ===
The Court wrote that its "precedents do not support the existence of a constitutional cause of action behind every statement a public employee makes in the course of doing his or her job." Instead, public employees are not speaking as citizens when they are speaking to fulfill a responsibility of their job.

Though the speech at issue concerned the subject matter of his employment, and was expressed within his office rather than publicly, the Court did not consider either fact dispositive, and noted that employees in either context may receive First Amendment protection. The "controlling factor" was instead that his statements were made pursuant to his duties as a deputy district attorney. Restricting such speech, which "owes its existence to a public employee's professional responsibilities," did not in the Court's view violate any rights that the employee had as a private citizen. Instead, the restrictions were simply the control an employer exercised "over what the employer itself has commissioned or created."

The Court found that Ceballos did not act as a citizen when he wrote the memo that addressed the proper disposition of a pending criminal case; he instead acted as a government employee. "The fact that his duties sometimes required him to speak or write does not mean his supervisors were prohibited from evaluating his performance." The Court believed this result was consistent with its precedents regarding the protected speech of public employees, because barring First Amendment claims based on "government employees' work product," as the Court characterized the speech at issue, would not prevent those employees from participating in public debate.

The Court criticized the Ninth Circuit's ruling, which had perceived a "doctrinal anomaly" between the toleration of employee speech made publicly but not made pursuant to assigned duties resulting from a misconception of "the theoretical underpinnings of our decisions." The Court instead found a reason for limiting First Amendment protection to public statements made outside the scope of official duties "because that is the kind of activity engaged in by citizens who do not work for the government."

The Court finally rejected the argument raised in Justice Souter's dissent that employers could restrict the rights of employees "by creating excessively broad job descriptions." Instead, the Court observed that formal job descriptions do not always correspond to actual expected duties, "and the listing of a given task in an employee's written job description is neither necessary nor sufficient to demonstrate that conducting the task is within the scope of the employee's professional duties for First Amendment purposes." The Court also reserved for a future decision the issue of whether its analysis would apply in the same manner to a case involving speech related to scholarship or teaching.

=== Stevens' dissent ===
Justice Stevens filed a brief dissent. Though he agreed with the majority's determination that a supervisor may take corrective action against "inflammatory or misguided" speech, he questioned whether the same logic applies against "unwelcome speech" that "reveals facts that the supervisor would rather not have anyone else discover." Citing Givhan v. Western Line Consolidated School District (1979), Justice Stevens emphatically disagreed with the notion that there was a categorical difference between speech uttered by a citizen or by an employee in the course of his duties. In Givhan, ruling on the issue of an English teacher voicing concerns to the principal about the school's racist employment practices, the Court did not evaluate whether these concerns were raised in accordance with her job duties. Consequently, "our silence [in Givhan]...demonstrates that the point was immaterial." Stevens added that it would be senseless for the constitutional protection of same words to be contingent on whether they are uttered as part of one's job duties; additionally, it would be "perverse" for the Court to essentially create an incentive for employees to bypass their employer-specified channels of resolution and voice their concerns directly to the public.

=== Souter's dissent ===
Justice Souter's dissent was joined by Justice Stevens and Justice Ginsburg.

Like Justice Stevens, Souter agreed with the majority that a government employer has an active interest in effectuating its objectives, and can take corresponding action to ensure "competence, honesty, and judgment" from its employees. However, he argued that the interests in addressing official wrongdoing and threats to health and safety may trump the employer's interest, and that in such cases, public employees are eligible from the protections of the First Amendment.

Souter underlined that government employees may often be in best positions to know the problems that exist in their employer agencies. Citing Givhan, Souter said that under the majority's view, the English schoolteacher is protected when complaining to the principal about discriminatory hiring policy, as such policy is not part of the job description of the teacher; however, if a school personnel office made that same complaint, he or she would not be entitled to that same protection. "This is an odd place to draw a distinction," Souter noted, particularly because the majority, in his view, did not justify its choice of distinction.

The Court's decision to qualify speech protection in Pickering v. Board of Ed. of Township High School Dist. (1968), aimed to create a balance that would resolve the tension between individual and public interest in the speech on one hand, and the public employer's interest in efficient operation, on the other. Souter wrote that the need to balance these competing needs hardly disappears when the employee happens to speak on issues that his job requires him to address. As noted in Waters, supra, such an employee is likely to be intimately aware of the precise nature of the problem exactly because it falls within his duties.

Though sharing the majority's concerns about the employer's interest in maintaining civility and competency in the workplace, Souter did not believe that such an interest required a categorical exclusion of First Amendment protections. Indeed, he added, the goal of most constitutional adjudication is to "resist the demand for winner-take-all" that has occurred under the majority opinion. He also voiced a concern that government employers would expand their employees' jobs descriptions to further exclude protection of speech that is currently protected by the First Amendment.

Souter elaborated on two reasons why an adjustment in line with the Pickering balancing test would be feasible in this instance. First, the extent of the public employer's authority over speech can be predetermined in advance to set up a barrier of sorts that the employee engaging in speech would have to overcome. In this way, the employee speaking on matters in the course of his employment would not be able to overcome the barrier unless he speaks "on a matter of unusual importance and satisfies high standards of responsibility in the way he does it." Additionally, should the incorporation of such a standard fail to discourage meritless action, the matter would get resolved at the summary-judgment level.

The second reason Souter cited for using Pickering in the case at hand was connected to legal outcomes in the Circuit levels. He noted that First Amendment protections even less limited than articulated above have been available in the Ninth Circuit for almost two decades, but the existence of these protections did not result in a "debilitating flood of litigation" there or in the other Circuits.

Souter also rebuked the majority for accepting the incorrect view that any statement made by a public employee constitutes, or should be treated as, the government's own speech, because such a view is valid only when a public employee is hired to promote a particular policy by communicating a particular message. He further disagreed with the majority's argument for limiting the Pickering doctrine, which held that the First Amendment protections were unnecessary in light of the existence of a comprehensive set of state and federal statutes that protected government whistle-blowers. Souter noted that speech that addressed official wrongdoing may well be unprotected under existing statutory protections (e.g., the teacher in Givhan would not qualify as a whistle-blower).

Finally, Souter also voiced a concern about the breadth of the majority holding, noting that it was spacious enough to imperil even the First Amendment protection of academic freedom in public colleges and public universities.

=== Breyer's dissent ===
Justice Breyer dissented from the majority opinion; he also noted that he could not accept Justice Souter's answer as satisfactory.

Breyer agreed that the First Amendment protections cannot be universal for plurality speech, political speech, or government speech. In instances where the speech of government employees is concerned, the First Amendment protections exist only when such protection does not unduly interfere with governmental interests. In cases where the employee speaks as a citizen upon matters of public concern, the speech receives protection only if it passes the Pickering balancing test. However, prior cases did not decide what screening test a judge should utilize in circumstances where the government employee both speaks upon matters of public concern, and speaks in the course of his public employee duties.

Like Souter, Breyer believed that the majority's holding that the First Amendment protections do not extend to public employees speaking pursuant to their official duties was too absolute. In the instant case, the speech was professional speech, as it was uttered by a lawyer. As such, it is governed also by "canons of the profession"; these canons contain an obligation to speak in certain instances. In cases where this occurs, the government's interest in prohibiting that speech is diminished.

Additionally, Breyer wrote that the Constitution itself imposed speech obligations on professional employees. For example, a prosecutor has a constitutional obligation to preserve, and to communicate with the defense about exculpatory evidence in the possession of the government. Therefore, where there are both professional and constitutional such obligations, "the need to protect the employee's speech is augmented, the need for broad government authority is likely diminished, and administrable standards are quite likely available." Breyer added that in such cases, the Constitution requires special protection of employee speech, and the Pickering balancing test should apply.

Though Breyer noted that he agrees with much of Souter's analysis, he wrote that Souter's constitutional standard does not give sufficient weight to the serious "managerial and administrative concerns" described by the majority. Souter's proposed barrier would not screen out very many cases, because there are too many issues of public concern; further, the speech of a vast many public employees deals with wrongdoing, health, safety, and honesty, and such a rule would protect speech by an employee engaged in almost any public function. The problem with such wide coverage is that the standard enunciated by Souter would not avoid the judicial need "to undertake the balance in the first place."

== Subsequent developments ==
In a telephone interview with the San Francisco Chronicle, Ceballos said, "it puts your average government employee in one heck of a predicament ... I think government employees will be more inclined to keep quiet."

The outcry among whistle-blower advocates and First Amendment advocates was particularly extensive. Whistleblower lawyer Stephen M. Kohn called the ruling "the single biggest setback for whistleblowers in the courts in the past 25 years." Under the ruling, Kohn says, public employees—all 22 million of them—have no First Amendment rights when they are acting in an official capacity, and in many cases are not protected against retaliation. Kohn estimates that "no less than 90 percent of all whistleblowers will lose their cases on the basis of this decision."

The law blog Balkinization published an extensive review of the decision by guest writer Marty Lederman and an analysis by blog owner Jack Balkin.

In 2014, the Ninth Circuit Court of Appeals circumscribed Garcetti, ruling in Demers v. Austin that the First Amendment protects faculty speech that criticizes university administrators on issues of public concern related to teaching or scholarship. The decision, penned by William A. Fletcher, essentially extends free-speech protection to the process known as shared governance.
