= Electroshock weapon =

Incapacitating less-lethal weapon

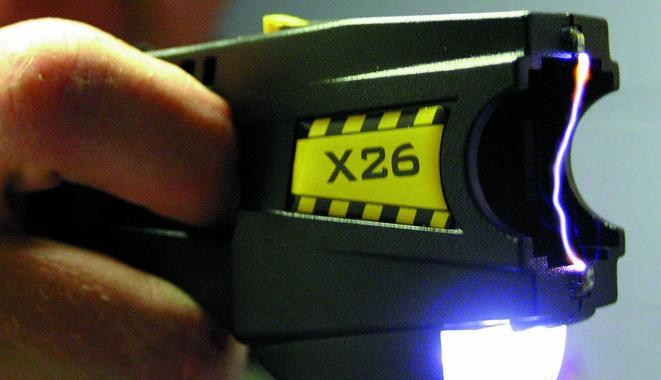
A Taser X26, a type of ranged or hybrid ranged–melee electroshock weapon, with cartridge removed, making an electric arc between its two electrodes.

An electroshock weapon ("EW")—sometimes referred to, imprecisely, as an electronic weapon or electrical weapon, and generically known as an electroshock device—is a type of less-than-lethal weapon that functions by delivering an electric shock to a target to temporarily immobilize it. Several broad sub-types of electroshock weapons exist, and, depending upon the jurisdiction and specific technology or design in question, these devices are officially categorized by law enforcement and regulatory bodies as conducted energy weapons or conducted electrical weapons, and rarely as conducted electronic weapons (CEW); or as conducted energy devices or conducted electronic devices (CED).

Colloquially and generically, electroshock weapons are frequently referred to by the Axon brand name and generic trademark Taser, a proprietary eponym derived from the company's original projectile electroshock device, the TASER (an acronym for "Thomas A. Swift's Electric Rifle"); they are also broadly termed stun guns. Stun guns and Taser devices are, however, separate types of electroshock weapon.

Electroshock weapons are engineered to pass electric current through a target with the aim of either temporarily disturbing muscle function or inflicting pain, usually without causing significant injury. Their disorienting, motor-disrupting, and—in the case of powerful projectile electroshock devices—immobilizing effects, as well as their less-than-lethal design, make them a common option for use both in personal self-defense and by law enforcement officers in administering an intermediate level of force, as well as by wildlife conservationists.

Various types of electroshock weapons exist. Stun guns, stun batons (sometimes also called stun prods or, simply, prods), and stun belts (also called shock belts) administer an electric shock by direct contact, whereas Tasers are capable of firing projectiles that administer the shock through dart probes attached to flexible wires. Long-range self-contained electroshock projectiles that can be utilized as specialty ammunition, such as standalone electroshock rounds fired from ordinary shotguns, have also been developed; these niche missiles do not require the connected wires found in Tasers.

Though the two terms are often either misapplied to refer to all electroshock weapons regardless of category or are used interchangeably, stun guns and Tasers are distinct forms of electroshock device. Stun guns are direct-contact weapons that work primarily to induce localized pain, thereby compelling pain compliance, and otherwise by locally affecting the sensory nervous system; stun guns can additionally cause some degree of muscular disruption, but that effect generally requires 3–5 seconds of direct contact to be made with a target using the activated device. Meanwhile, the metonomously-named Taser is, by comparison, designed to function primarily as a ranged weapon, firing projectiles in the form of electrified barbed darts attached to long wires intended to fully incapacitate a target by disrupting voluntary muscular control through the motor nervous system. However, some 'hybrid' models of Taser blur this distinction, as they are capable of delivering a "Drive Stun", a proprietary pain compliance technique involving placing the weapon in direct contact with the subject's body and discharging a shock without firing, or after only partially firing, the probes.

== History ==
The electric cattle prod is the earliest iteration of electroshock device: Used by ranchers and farmhands to drive and encourage the movement of cattle, the electric cattle prod was developed by American inventor John M. Burton of Wichita, Kansas, who filed a patent (U.S. patent № 427,459—specifically US427459A—"Electric Prod-Pole") for the device on May 24, 1892. Burton's invention was intended to replace historical, non-electric cattle-driving tools, such as the goad, slapper, and stock cane.

Commercialized in the early 20th century, advertisements in The Electrical Experimenter magazine show that electric prods were being manufactured and sold as early as April 1917.

In 1935, Ciril (or Cirilo) Diaz of Cuba designed an electroshock glove for use by police forces. As noted in an exposé on the topic featured in that year's September issue of Modern Mechanix magazine (later Mechanix Illustrated), the glove, wired to a half-pound belt-mounted battery, delivered 1,500 volts of electricity (only 3% of the modern Taser's voltage).

In 1952, the U.S. Army, seeking a weapons option that avoided the noise produced by gunfire, experimented with developing electroshock weapons for use by special forces Army commandos. The prototype devices and blueprints arising from these experiments in 1952 are sometimes cited as representing the first true stun gun designs.

Jack Cover, a NASA researcher, began formally developing the Taser in 1969. By 1974, he had completed the device, which he named after his childhood hero Tom Swift ("Thomas A. Swift's electric rifle"). The Taser Public Defender product used gunpowder as its propellant, which led the Bureau of Alcohol, Tobacco and Firearms to classify it as a firearm in 1976. Cover's patent was adapted by Nova Technologies in 1983 for the Nova XR-5000, their first non-projectile hand-held style stun gun. The XR-5000 design was widely copied as the source for the compact handheld stun gun used today.

== Principle of operation ==
Electroshock weapon technology uses a temporary high-voltage, low-current electrical discharge to override the body's muscle-triggering mechanisms. Commonly referred to as a stun gun, electroshock weapons are a relative of cattle prods, which have been around for over 100 years and are the precursor of stun guns. The recipient is immobilized via two metal probes connected via wires to the electroshock device. The recipient feels pain, and can be momentarily paralyzed while an electric current is being applied. Essential to the operation of electroshock, stun guns and cattle prods is sufficient current to allow the weapon to stun. Without current these weapons cannot stun and the degree to which the weapon is capable of stunning depends on its proper use of current. It is reported that applying electroshock devices to more sensitive parts of the body is even more painful. The maximum effective areas for stun gun usage are upper shoulder, below the rib cage, and the upper hip. High voltages are used, but because most devices use a less-lethal current, death does not usually occur from a single shock. The resulting "shock" is caused by muscles twitching uncontrollably, appearing as muscle spasms.

The internal circuits of most electroshock weapons are fairly simple, based on either an oscillator, resonant circuit (a power inverter), and step-up transformer or a diode-capacitor voltage multiplier to achieve an alternating high-voltage discharge or a continuous direct-current discharge. It may be powered by one or more batteries depending on manufacturer and model. The amount of current generated depends on what stunning capabilities are desired, but without proper current calculations, the cause and effect of high voltage is muted. Output voltage is claimed to be in the range of 100 V up to 6 kV; current intensity output is claimed to be in the range of 100 to 500 mA; individual impulse duration is claimed to be in the range of 10 to 100 μs (microseconds); frequency of impulse is claimed to be in the range of 2 to 40 Hz; electrical charge delivered is claimed to be in the range of 15 to 500 μC (microcoulombs); energy delivered is claimed to be in the range of 0.9 to 10 J. The output current upon contact with the target will depend on various factors such as target's resistance, skin type, moisture, bodily salinity, clothing, the electroshock weapon's internal circuitry, discharge waveform, and battery conditions.

The M-26 Taser models produce a peak current of 18 amperes in pulses that last for around 10 microseconds.

Manufacturers' instructions and manuals shipped with the products state that a half-second shock duration will cause intense pain and muscle contractions, startling most people greatly. Two to three seconds will often cause the recipient to become dazed and drop to the ground, and over three seconds will usually completely disorient and drop the recipient for at least several seconds. Taser International warns law enforcement agencies that "prolonged or continuous exposure(s) to the TASER device's electrical charge" may lead to medical risks such as cumulative exhaustion and breathing impairment.

Because there was no automatic stop on older model Taser devices, many officers have used it repeatedly or for a prolonged period of time, thus potentially contributing to suspects' injuries or death. The current X26 model automatically stops five seconds after the trigger is depressed and then the trigger must be depressed again to send another shock. The trigger can be held down continuously for a longer shock or the device can be switched off before the full five seconds have elapsed. The devices have no protections against multiple police officers giving multiple shocks, cumulatively exceeding the recommended maximum levels.

=== Countermeasures ===
There is a fabric that purports to protect the wearer from Taser devices or other electroshock weapons.

== Commercially available varieties ==
=== Stun guns ===
The term "stun gun" refers to a category of electroshock weapons that function solely in melee use, designed exclusively for close-quarters, or hand-to-hand, self-defense and protection.

Although the constituent word "gun" implies a projectile-firing weapon, the phrase "stun gun" originated in the 1970s as marketing tactic to boost sales of these then-nascent contact devices. The original projectile-firing TASER, predating the invention of the modern contact stun gun, had frequently been described by the press, to positive reception, as an "electronic stun gun"; seizing on this term to drive sales, manufacturers of the cheaper, contact-based alternatives adopted "stun gun" to market their own devices.

Stun guns exist in a wide range of sizes, shapes, and designs, from "keychain", "nano", "micro", or "mini" stun guns which, at their smallest, are no larger than an oversized pack of chewing gum or bulky flash drive; to derivative sub-types in the form of long, heavy-duty stun weapons doubling as flashlights, batons, trekking poles, and umbrellas.

Though, as with other electroshock and less-lethal defense and security devices, the legality of their purchase, importation, transportation, carry, and use varies by country and jurisdiction, commercial stun guns are variously manufactured for sale to civilians, law enforcement, security personnel, and—albeit more rarely—military (especially military police) forces.

Tasers

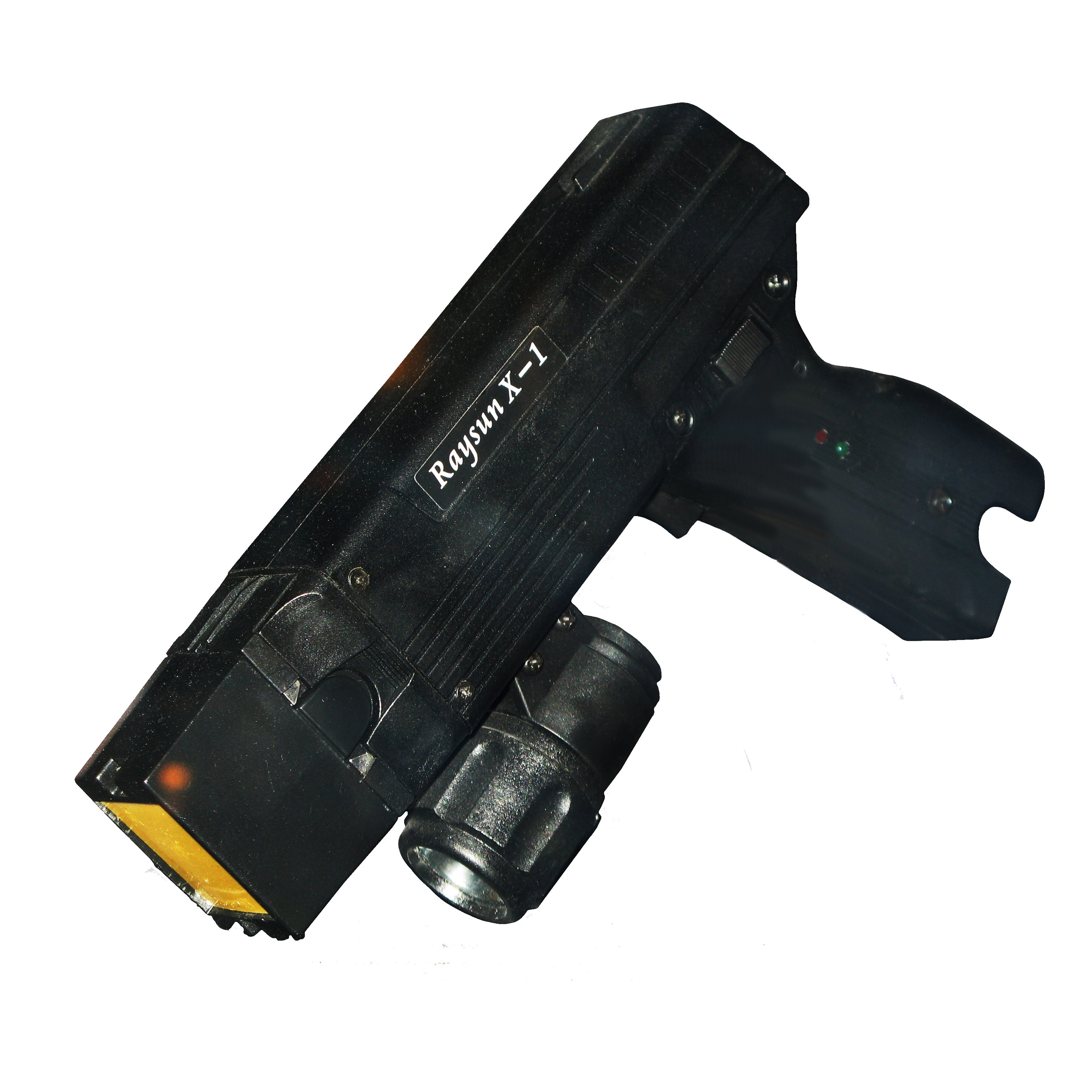
Raysun X-1, a multi-purpose handheld weapon that fires two stun probes (for high-voltage shocks), rubber bullets, pepper, and paintballs. Without the probes it works as a stun gun.

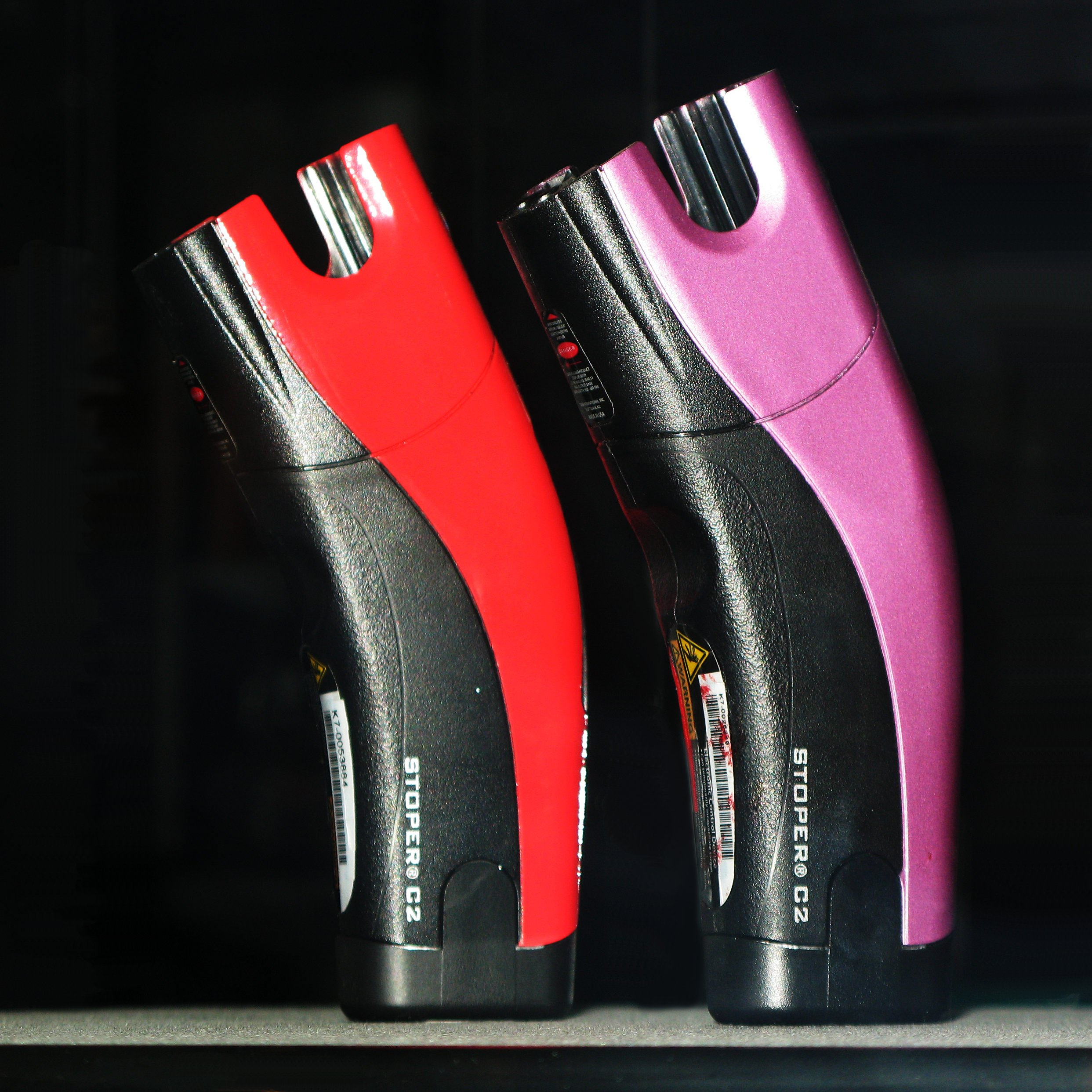
Taser Stoper C2, with cartridge removed. A self-defense weapon.

=== Taser ===
A Taser ("Taser" usually stylized in title case, though the word was originally an acronym, "TASER", for "Thomas A. Swift's Electric Rifle") is any member of a line of handheld conducted energy devices (CEDs) sold by Axon Enterprise, Inc. (formerly Taser International, Inc.). Taser devices are projectile, or ranged, weapons: A Taser fires two small dart-like electrodes which remain connected to the main unit by conductors. It delivers electric current to disrupt voluntary control of muscles resulting in pain and broad "neuromuscular incapacitation" (NMI).

=== Wireless long-range electric shock weapon ===
Taser International has developed a long-range wireless electro-shock projectile called XREP (eXtended Range Electro-Muscular Projectile), which can be fired from any 12-gauge shotgun. It contains a small high-voltage battery. Its range is currently 30 metres (98 ft), but the U.S. Department of Defense, which funded development for the technology, expected delivery of a 90 metres (300 ft) range projectile of this type from the company in 2007.

An XREP projectile was controversially used by British police during the 2010 Northumbria Police manhunt. It subsequently transpired that the XREP had never been officially approved for use in the United Kingdom and the weapon system was provided unrequested to the police at the scene directly by the civilian company which distributes Taser International's products in the UK. The company's license to provide Taser systems was afterwards revoked by the Home Secretary Theresa May.

== Controversies ==
Because of the use of electricity and the claim of the weapon being non-lethal, controversy has sprouted over particular incidents involving the weapon and the use of the weapon in general. In essence, controversy has been centered on the justification of the use of the weapon in certain instances, and, in some cases, health issues that are claimed to be due to the use of the weapon.

Tests conducted by the Cleveland Clinic found that Taser CEWs did not interfere with pacemakers and implantable defibrillators. A study conducted by emergency medicine physicians at the University of California, San Diego, US showed no lasting effects of the Taser device on healthy test subjects. However, Taser International no longer claims the devices are "non-lethal", instead saying they "are more effective and safer than other use-of-force options".

Currently, Taser devices are programmed to be activated in automatic five second bursts, and the operator can stop the energy charge by engaging the safety switch. The charge can also be prolonged beyond five seconds if the trigger is held down continuously. The operator can also inflict repeated shock cycles with each pull of the trigger as long as both barbs remain attached to the subject. The only technical limit to the number or length of the electrical cycles is the life of the battery, which can be ten minutes or more.

Concerns about the use of conducted electrical weapons have arisen from cases that include the death of the Polish immigrant Robert Dziekanski at the airport in Vancouver, Canada where he died after the RCMP officer, in spite of his training, repeatedly stunned him with a Taser. The report by forensic pathologist Charles Lee, of Vancouver General Hospital, listed the principal cause of death as "sudden death during restraint", with a contributory factor of "chronic alcoholism".

A similar incident occurred in Sydney, Australia, to Roberto Laudisio Curti, a 21-year-old tourist from Brazil. He died after repeated exposure to a Taser device even after being physically apprehended (by the weight of several police officers lying on top of him compressing his chest and making it hard to breathe. He was pepper sprayed at the same time). The Coroner was scathing of the "thuggish" behavior of the police. The repeated use of several Taser devices was considered excessive and unnecessary.

A study for the Canadian Broadcasting Corporation, indicated that the threshold of energy needed to induce deadly ventricular fibrillation decreased dramatically with each successive burst of pulses; however, one pulse may provide enough energy to induce deadly ventricular fibrillation in some cases. The threshold for women may be less.

Although the Taser CEW is a programmable device, the controlling software does not limit the number of the bursts of pulses and the time between bursts while the trigger is held down continuously, or the number of times the shock cycles can be repeated.

=== Legal issues ===
Electroshock weapons have been made illegal in Germany by supplement 2 WaffG if they do not carry an official seal of approval demonstrating they do not constitute a health risk. As of July, 2011, no such seal has been issued to any device on the market. According to § 40 Abs. 4 WaffG, the German federal police may approve of exceptions. Such a special approval for purchase, ownership and carrying was in effect until 31 December 2010. As of 1 January 2011, only devices carrying the PTB's seal of approval are legal. Previous owners may keep their devices, but cannot carry or sell them. Electroshock weapons effective over a distance, like Taser CEWs, have been completely outlawed in Germany since 1 April 2008.

In the United Kingdom the possession and purchase of any weapon of whatever description designed or adapted for the discharge of any noxious liquid, gas or other thing is prohibited. This includes electroshock weapons.

=== Torture ===
The United Nations Committee against Torture reports that the use of Taser devices can be a form of torture, due to the acute pain they cause, and warns against the possibility of death in some cases. The use of stun belts has been condemned by Amnesty International as torture, not only for the physical pain the devices cause, but also for their heightened abuse potential, due to their perceived "harmlessness" in terms of causing initial injuries, like ordinary police batons do. Amnesty International has reported several alleged cases of excessive electroshock gun use that possibly amount to torture. They have also raised extensive concerns about the use of other electro-shock devices by American police and in American prisons, as they can be (and according to Amnesty International, sometimes are) used to inflict cruel pain on individuals.

Taser CEWs may also not leave the telltale markings that a conventional beating might. The American Civil Liberties Union has also raised concerns about their use, as has the British human rights organization Resist Cardiac Arrest.

== Legality ==
=== Argentina ===
In 2010, one court ruled against the use of five imported Taser devices by the Buenos Aires Metropolitan Police, to comply with a claim from the Human Rights Observatorium, that states that Taser CEWs are considered an instrument of torture by NGOs and the Committee against Torture of the UN.

=== Australia ===
Possession, ownership and use of a stun gun (including Taser CEWs) by civilians is considerably restricted, if not illegal in all States and Territories. The importation into Australia is restricted with permits being required.

Stun gun use in Australian law enforcement is as follows:

- Australian Federal Police and Australian Capital Territory: used only by officers attached to the Specialist Response Group, qualified general duties (patrol) Sergeants within ACT Policing and Aviation portfolios, and qualified members of Specialist Support Teams in regional offices.
- New South Wales: Used by general duties (patrol), supervisors/duty officers and specialist officers attached to the Tactical Operations Unit and Public Order and Riot Squad.
- Northern Territory: Used by both general duties (patrol) and the Territory Response Group.
- Queensland: Used by both general duties (patrol) and Special Emergency Response Team.
- South Australia: Used by all front line Police, STAR Group and Country Members in limited capacity.
- Tasmania: Used only by the Special Operations Group
- Victoria: Used by the Critical Incident Response Team and Special Operations Group. A year long trial at Bendigo and Morwell stations is also underway by general duties police.
- Western Australia: Used by both general duties (patrol) and the Tactical Response Group.

=== Austria ===
Austria allows police to use stun guns, including Taser CEWs. After using a Taser CEW, police must immediately call for an ambulance. The victim must be medically checked directly at the place of the shooting, and only a medically trained person may remove the darts. From 2006 to 2012, Austrian police used Taser CEWs 133 times—127 against humans and six against dogs. About 1,000 police officers were permitted in 2012 to carry and use a Taser CEW.

=== Brazil ===
Use of the Taser device is legal for the police in Brazil. Its use is widespread mainly in the Guardas Municipais (Municipal Guards), who receive professional training in the use of electro-conductive pistols. Taser devices are also used by military police and specialized forces. There are laws allowing their use by private security companies, but such use is unusual because of the expense of maintaining a Taser CEW compared with a gun.

=== Canada ===
==== Stun guns ====
Civilian ownership of electroshock weapons is limited by the Criminal Code. Stun guns are generally classed as "prohibited weapons", making them illegal for civilian ownership. However, stun batons with a length of at least 48 centimetres (19 in) are legal to own (but not carry). In any case, carrying any type of weapon (including electroshock weapons) in public is generally prohibited.

==== Conducted energy weapons (Tasers) ====
According to previous interpretation of the Firearms Act, Taser CEWs were considered "prohibited weapons" and could be used only by members of law-enforcement agencies after they were imported into the country under a special permit. The possession of restricted weapons must be licensed by the Royal Canadian Mounted Police (RCMP) Canadian Firearms Program unless exempted by law. A 2008 review of the Firearms Act found that the act classifies "the TASER Public Defender and any variant or modified version of it" as "prohibited firearms". However, Canadian police forces typically treat TASER devices as "prohibited weapons", inconsistent with the restrictions on firearms.

The direct source for this information comes from an independent report produced by Compliance Strategy Group for the Royal Canadian Mounted Police. The report is called An Independent Review of the Adoption and Use of Conducted Energy Weapons by the Royal Canadian Mounted Police. In the report that is available through access to information, the authors argued that the CEW was, for several years after its adoption by the RCMP, erroneously characterized as a prohibited "weapon" under the Criminal Code, as opposed to a prohibited "firearm". This misunderstanding was subsequently incorporated into the RCMP's operational policies and procedures as well as those of other police services in Canada.

While the most recent RCMP operational manual, completed in 2007, correctly refers to the CEW as a prohibited firearm, a number of consequences of this error in classification remain to be dealt with, by both the RCMP and other Canadian police services. Consequently, it could be argued the police in Canada may not have had the proper authority under their provincial policing Acts and Regulation to use the CEW in the first place. The point of unauthorized use by the police was also raised by Dirk Ryneveld, British Columbia's Police Complaint Commissioner at the Braidwood inquiry on June 25, 2008. Taser device safety and issues have been extensively rehearsed and investigated after the Robert Dziekański Taser CEW incident at Vancouver International Airport.

=== China ===
Under the Law of the People's Republic of China on the Control of Firearms and Public Security Punishment Law, stun guns and Tasers are prohibited for civilian ownership in China without an application for a state licence. A weapons permit is required to purchase and own a stun gun or Taser.

=== Czech Republic ===
Electroshock weapons that require direct contact are not regulated by Czech law. They may be purchased, owned and carried for personal protection without any limitations.

Taser CEWs are considered class C-I firearms under Czech law, i.e. freely available over the counter, however the owner must be older than 18, have full legal capacity, place of residence in the Czech Republic, clean criminal record, full mental capacity and must register the Taser with police.

=== Finland ===
In Finland possession of a Taser CEW is legal only for police officers. Police have been using Taser CEWs since 2005. Nowadays there is one in almost every patrol car.

=== France ===
Taser devices are used by the French National Police and Gendarmerie. In September 2008, they were made available to local police by a government decree, but in September 2009, the Council of State reversed the decision judging that the specificities of the weapon required a stricter regulation and control. However, since the murder of a policewoman on duty, the Taser CEW has been in use again by local police forces since 2010.

=== Germany ===
The purchase, possession, and carrying of Taser devices in Germany has been prohibited since April 1, 2008 (gun control law: Anlage 2, Abschnitt 1, Nr. 1.3.6. WaffG). However Taser devices are in use by police SWAT teams, Spezialeinsatzkommando (SEK) and others, in 13 out of 16 German states.

=== Greece ===
Greek police use Taser CEWs. Greek Police special forces used a Taser CEW to end the hijacking of a Turkish Airlines A310 by a Turkish citizen at Athens International Airport in March 2003.

=== Hong Kong ===
Under Hong Kong laws, Chapter 238 Firearms and Ammunition Ordinance, "Any portable device which is designed or adapted to stun or disable a person by means of an electric shock applied either with or without direct contact with that person" is considered an "arm" and therefore, the importation, possession and exportation of Taser devices requires a license from the Hong Kong Police Force. They are otherwise illegal, and violation carries penalties up to a $100,000 fine and 14 years in jail.

=== Iceland ===
Use of Taser devices is generally prohibited in Iceland.

=== Ireland ===
Specialist units of Ireland's national police force (Garda Síochána) use the X26 model; Special Detective Unit, Emergency Response Unit and Armed Support Units. Issuing Taser CEWs to all members of the force (who are generally unarmed) was under consideration as of 2013. Use of Taser CEWs in Ireland by private individuals is prohibited.

=== Israel ===
The Israeli police have approved using Taser devices. As of 16 February 2009, the first Taser CEWs became available to police units.

Israeli Defense Force first usage

Taser devices were first used by the Israeli Defense Force by the former special counter-terror unit Force 100 in 2004. The unit was disbanded in 2006. Taser CEWs are expected to re-enter operational use by the Israeli Defense Forces in the near future.

As of August 18, 2013, the use of Taser devices by Israeli police was temporarily suspended by Police Chief Yohanan Danino; after such instruments were used repeatedly and excessively by police against a person who allegedly was unarmed and who was not resisting a warranted arrest. But two weeks later the Taser CEW was unsuspended.

=== Japan ===
Under the Firearm and Sword Possession Control Law, import, carrying, purchase of conducted energy weapons is prohibited in Japan. Stun guns are legal to own, although carrying without "justifiable grounds" is illegal and can be prosecuted under the Minor Offenses Act.

=== Kenya ===
Under Kenya's Firearms Act, a Taser device is considered a firearm, as per section 2 (a) (ii) of the Act. The section offers one of the descriptions for a firearm as "a lethal barrelled weapon of any description from which any shot, bullet or other missile can be discharged or which can be adapted for the discharge of any shot, bullet or other missile and includes ... an electrical charge which when it strikes any person or animal is of sufficient strength to stun and temporarily disable the person or animal struck (such weapon being commonly known as a 'stun gun' or 'electronic paralyser' ".

=== Malaysia ===
Royal Malaysia Police are set to become the second in Southeast Asia police force after Singapore Police Force to use the less-lethal Taser X26 CEW. The Taser X26 CEW that Malaysian police bought comes with a holster and uses a non-rechargeable lithium battery able to deliver 195 cartridge shots. Policemen on rounds are issued four cartridges. The Taser devices were issued to policemen in Petaling Jaya, Dang Wangi in Kuala Lumpur and Johor Bahru.

=== New Zealand ===
A large-scale and generally well received trial by the New Zealand Police saw Taser devices presented almost 800 times and fired over 100 times, but firing was "ineffective" about a third of the time. The Taser device had been "unintentionally discharged" more often than they had been used properly in the line of duty.

In October 2012, police said the TASER device had been "very successful in de-escalating dangerous and potentially life-threatening situations". Since their introduction, TASER CEWs had been presented 1320 times but only fired 212 times, resulting in 13 injuries. In July 2015, the Police Commissioner announced that TASER CEWs would be routinely carried by all police officers.

=== Russia ===
Stun guns and Tasers manufactured in Russia can be purchased for self-defense without special permission, however, under the Federal Law No. 150 "On Weapons" of the Russian Federation it's illegal to import and subsequent sale of any foreign stun devices or Tasers into the country. The ban has been in place since the first version of the law was approved in 1996.

=== South Korea ===
Requires a permit to manufacture, distribute, purchase or carry an electroshock weapon. Any electroshock devices with a projectile (TASER devices) are completely banned for civilian use.

=== Sweden ===
Taser devices and other electronic control devices are considered firearms in Sweden and are banned for civilian use. The Swedish Police Authority had purchased a limited quantity of Taser CEWs, and was about to initiate field trials when these were cancelled in 2005 after an ethics commission found that the need for (and risks of) such devices was not firmly established. The purchased Taser CEWs were then donated to Finland, where field trials were initiated. Since January 1, 2018, the Swedish police have been conducting tests with electroshock weapons for a two-year period and during the trial period approximately 700 police officers are trained. The move has been welcomed by the country's union for law enforcement.

=== United Kingdom ===
TASER CEWs are considered "prohibited weapons" under the Firearms Act 1968 and possession or construction is an offence. The maximum sentence for possession is ten years in prison and an unlimited fine. There is a minimum sentence of 5 years imprisonment if the TASER device is disguised as another object such as a torch or a mobile phone.

A related clause being considered for addition to "The Police, Crime, Sentencing and Courts Act" would make electronic components, assemblies and other devices that can be adapted or assembled to build an improvized CEW, as well as the schematic diagrams for them illegal in the UK. This would include for example HV generator modules that generate over 2KV unloaded which would also cover items like CCFL driver modules, laptop backlight PCBs, car ionizers, TV cold cathode driver boards, photomultiplier drivers, night vision devices and plasma globes. The issue here is that such a far reaching Act would be detrimental to legitimate repair companies, scientists and hobbyists and do very little to deter criminals.

TASER CEWs are now used by some British police as a "less lethal" weapon. It was also announced in July 2007, that the deployment of TASER devices by specially trained police units who are not firearms officers, but who are facing similar threats of violence, would be trialled in ten police forces. The 12-month trial commenced on 1 September 2007, and took place in the following forces: Avon & Somerset, Devon & Cornwall, Gwent, Lincolnshire, Merseyside, Metropolitan Police, Northamptonshire, Northumbria, North Wales and West Yorkshire.

Following the completion of the trial, the Home Secretary agreed on 24 November 2008 to allow chief police officers of all forces in England and Wales, from 1 December 2008, to extend TASER CEW use to specially trained units in accordance with current Association of Chief Police Officers policy and guidance, which states that TASER CEWs can be used only where officers would be facing violence or threats of violence of such severity that they would need to use force to protect the public, themselves, and/or the subject(s).

Also, in Scotland Strathclyde Police agreed in February 2010 to arm 30 specially trained police officers using the TASER X26 CEW. The pilot would last three months and would be deployed in Glasgow City Centre and Rutherglen.

A fund for up to 10,000 additional TASER devices is being made available for individual chief police officers to bid for TASER devices based on their own operational requirements.

=== United States ===
Court cases in recent years have addressed the legality of TASER CEW use by police officers. In Bryan v. MacPherson, the Ninth Circuit Court of Appeals ruled that a TASER CEW had been used in a way that constituted excessive force and hence a violation of the Fourth Amendment. In the latter case Mattos v. Agarano, the same Court of Appeals found that in two situations involving TASER CEW use, one in drive-stun and one in dart mode, officers had used excessive force. According to an article in Police Chief magazine, this decision implies guidelines for the use of TASER CEWs and other Electronic Control Devices in gaining compliance (in a setting where safety is not an issue), including that the officer must give warning before each application, and that the suspect must be capable of compliance, with enough time to consider a warning, and to recover from the extreme pain of any prior application of the TASER device; and that TASER devices must not be used on children, the elderly, and women who are visibly pregnant or inform the officer of their pregnancy.

In 1991, an electroshock device supplied by Tasertron to the Los Angeles Police Department failed to subdue Rodney King—even after he was shocked twice with the device—causing officers to believe he was on PCP. Its lack of effectiveness was blamed on a possible battery problem.

TASER devices are considered the same as firearms by the United States government for the purposes of the Second Amendment protection, the right to keep and bear arms. They can be legally carried (concealed or openly) without a permit in almost every state. Their use in Connecticut, Illinois, and Wisconsin is legal with restrictions.

In March 2016, the Supreme Court of the United States ruled in Caetano v. Massachusetts that the Massachusetts Supreme Judicial Court erred in its rationale in upholding a law that prohibited the possession of stun guns. Though the decision didn't explicitly rule that stun gun bans are unconstitutional, it created doubt in laws forbidding their possession which led to many legal challenges and subsequent legalization of stun gun possession in previously prohibitive jurisdictions.

As of 2022, some local jurisdictions retain bans on stun guns.

- Hawaii's 1976 ban on stun guns was challenged in at least two lawsuits. As a result, the legislature passed HB891, legalizing stun guns in Hawaii as of January 1, 2022. A permit is not required but sellers must perform background checks and provide safety training.
- Previously, the U.S. Supreme Court had overruled the Massachusetts Supreme Judicial Court in the Caetano case. However, when the case was remanded, the state dismissed the charges, thus allowing it to retain its ban on stun guns at the time. The law remained in force but was challenged in a separate lawsuit. On April 17, 2018, the Massachusetts Supreme Judicial Court, in Ramirez v. Commonwealth, ruled that the state's 2004 ban on stun guns is unconstitutional.
- In 2012, Michigan's ban on stun guns was ruled unconstitutional by the Michigan Court of Appeals.
- On November 15, 2016, it was reported that New Jersey's Attorney General Christopher Porrino had conceded that the state's 1985 ban on stun guns is unconstitutional. On April 26, 2017, the lawsuit was settled by agreeing that the ban was unconstitutional and to promulgate regulations to allow for the possession of stun guns. The regulations allow for people over 18 to purchase stun guns, effective October 20, 2017.
- New York's ban on stun guns is being challenged by Matthew Avitabile. On March 22, 2019, the ban was ruled unconstitutional by the United States District Court for the Northern District of New York. But it was ruled constitutional by a state court on October 15, 2019.
- Rhode Island's ban on stun guns was ruled unconstitutional in March 2022.
- On September 29, 2016, Washington D.C. announced that it intends on repealing its ban on stun guns in response to a lawsuit. The new law regulating stun guns for persons 18 years or older took effect on May 19, 2017. Metropolitan Police Department issued a statement about the legality of stun guns.
- The United States Virgin Islands repealed its stun gun ban in 2016.
- In legalizing concealed carry of firearms in 2011, Wisconsin also legalized stun gun possession for people with a license.
- Chicago bans the sale of stun guns within its limits and imposes an application requirement followed by a 120-day waiting period for attempting to purchase a stun gun from outside the city. Illinois law requires licensure prior to possessing a stun gun in addition to several other restrictions. On March 21, 2019, the Supreme Court of Illinois ruled unanimously that the ban on possession or carriage of stun guns in public is facially unconstitutional. It ruled that a section of law which prohibits the carrying or transportation of stun guns is unconstitutional because an exception against the prohibition (possessing a concealed carry permit) only covers handguns, thus there is no exception for stun guns, and therefore the ban is unconstitutional. This leaves stun gun carriage legal without a permit.
- Newark's 2012 ban on stun guns was repealed on February 24, 2020. New Castle County and Wilmington retain their bans.
- Crawford County and Denison city (which is within Crawford County) ban stun guns.
- Anne Arundel County lifted its ban on stun guns in 2013 and Harford County did so in 2014. Howard County, facing a lawsuit over its ban on stun guns, repealed its law on February 21, 2017; Annapolis voted to repeal its ban on February 27, 2017; Baltimore County repealed its local ordinance in April 2017; Baltimore city's ban, in response to a lawsuit, was repealed on May 15, 2017 but retains bans on possession in public schools and state or city public buildings; Ocean City retains its ban but exempts from the ban homeowners in their home or persons with a concealed weapons permit.
- New Orleans' ban on stun guns was challenged in November 2016 and was eventually repealed on April 3, 2017.
- Overland Park, Kansas repealed its stun gun ban in 2014.
- Philadelphia repealed its 1977 stun gun ban in late October 2017.
- Bellingham repealed its ban on stun guns in 2016. Tacoma's ban was repealed on June 27, 2017. Ruston retains its ban.

== See also ==
- Bug zapper
- Electric fence
- Electric flyswatter
- Graduated Electronic Decelerator
