= Demers v. Austin =

Demers v. Austin (746 F.3d 402, 9th Cir., 2014) was a landmark decision of the Ninth Circuit Court of Appeals, extending First Amendment protection to professors at public universities for on-the-job speech that deals with public issues related to teaching or scholarship, whether inside or outside of the classroom. Demers carved out an exception to a 2006 U.S. Supreme Court decision (Garcetti v. Ceballos) that denied free speech protection to public employees. In doing so, Demers provided, for the first time in history, constitutional protection for faculty speech that criticizes policies and decisions of university administrations.

In 2009, Demers, a tenured faculty member in the Edward R. Murrow School (now College) of Communication at Washington State University, sued four administrators in a 42 U.S.C. § 1983 action when they allegedly retaliated against him after he circulated a 7-Step Plan calling for a restructuring of the academic units and urging administrators to seek accreditation for the program. In 2011, the U.S. District Court for the Eastern District of Washington granted summary judgment for the Defendant administrators, holding the plan was written as part of Demers's official duties and, therefore, was unprotected under Garcetti. The district court also held that the plan did not address a matter of public concern.

Writing for a three-judge panel in Seattle, lead judge William A. Fletcher declared that Demers's Plan was protected speech and dealt with matters of public concern. The appeals court reinstated the lawsuit. Fletcher wrote: "[T]eaching and academic writing are at the core of the official duties of teachers and professors. Such teaching and writing are 'a special concern of the First Amendment.' ... We conclude that if applied to teaching and academic writing, Garcetti would directly conflict with the important First Amendment values previously articulated by the Supreme Court. ... (which) has repeatedly stressed the importance of protecting academic freedom under the First Amendment. ... "

The university declined to appeal to the U.S. Supreme Court and eventually paid Demers $120,000 to drop the lawsuit.

The Demers decision is precedent in only nine states in the West. There is no on-the-job free-speech protection for professors in the other 41 states, who can be punished for criticizing administrators' policies and decisions even when they deal with issues of teaching or scholarship.

Matthew Jay Hertzog, director of Educational Technology at Methodist College, writes that Demers v. Austin and other cases are establishing Constitutional protection for academic freedom. "With the decisions of the lower courts in these cases being reversed by various U.S. Courts of Appeals ... , the constitutionally protected rights of academics for their academic speech and writing is being recognized as a First Amendment protection. As social and political events within higher education over the past several years have led university administrators to question the parameters of Constitutional protections and challenge the academic’s right to freedom of speech, the U.S. legal system has remained firm in its interpretation of the law by protecting a professor’s civil rights as well as those rights awarded to their academic speech and writings.

Demers himself has argued that the "single most important consequence of the Ninth Circuit Court of Appeals ruling in Demers v. Austin is the constitutional protection that it offers for shared governance in nine western states. The assumption underlying the Appeals Court ruling is that teaching and scholarship are impacted by the structure of the organization and its resources. And if those who do the teaching and scholarship have no say in how academic units are structured and how resources are distributed, then the academic search for truth, knowledge and understanding of the world will be compromised."

“Had the Ninth Circuit ruled the other way," legal scholar Kenneth White, a former prosecutor, writes, "then the state could fire professors at will if it didn’t like, for instance, the stance that a history professor took about a historical event, or a political science professor took about a political dispute, or any professor took about an issue of academic governance on a committee.”
