= Percy Anderson (judge) =

American judge (born 1948)

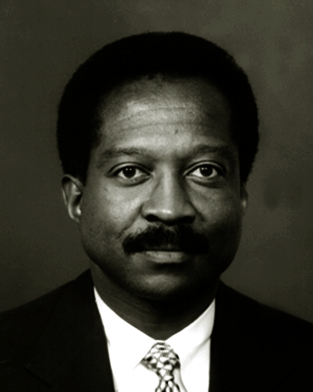

Judge of the United States District Court for the Central District of California
- Incumbent
- Assumed office May 1, 2002
- Appointed by: George W. Bush
- Preceded by: Kim McLane Wardlaw

Personal details
- Born: 1948 (age 77–78) Long Beach, California, U.S
- Party: Republican
- Education: University of California, Los Angeles (AB, JD)

Percy Anderson (born 1948) is a United States district judge of the United States District Court for the Central District of California.

== Early life and education ==
Anderson received an Artium Baccalaureus degree from the University of California, Los Angeles in 1970, followed by a Juris Doctor from UCLA School of Law in 1975.

== Career ==
From 1969 to 1972 he was a house advisor and later Assistant Dean of the UCLA Office of Housing. In 1972, he served as Auditor of the California Department of Finance. Anderson was a directing attorney for San Fernando Valley Neighborhood Legal Services, Inc., from 1975 to 1978, and was a lecturer at UCLA in 1977 and 1978. From 1979 to 1985, he was an assistant United States attorney for the Central District of California. From 1985 to 1996, Anderson was a partner at Bryan Cave.

Until his appointment to the district court, Anderson worked at Sonnenschein Nath & Rosenthal.

=== Federal judicial service ===
==== Lapsed nomination to district court under George H. W. Bush ====
In 1992, he was nominated by President George H. W. Bush to serve as a United States district judge for the Central District of California, but did not receive a Senate confirmation hearing.

==== Nomination to district court under George W. Bush ====
Anderson was nominated by President George W. Bush on January 23, 2002, to a seat on the United States District Court for the Central District of California vacated by Judge Kim McLane Wardlaw, who was elevated to the United States Court of Appeals for the Ninth Circuit on August 3, 1998. Anderson was confirmed by the United States Senate on April 25, 2002, and received his commission on May 1, 2002.

=== Notable opinions and actions ===
In 2006, Anderson was removed from a wrongful conviction lawsuit case by the United States Court of Appeals for the Ninth Circuit. Lawyers for the plaintiff, a man who had spent twelve years in prison on a rape conviction but was later cleared by DNA evidence, had complained that Anderson was biased against the plaintiff. On the day Anderson declared a mistrial (due to a deadlocked jury), a three-judge panel from the Ninth Circuit ruled that due to Anderson's actions during the case his "impartiality might be questioned" and that the case should be expediently retried before another judge.

In 2008, the Ninth Circuit overturned a trial Anderson presided over, ruling that Anderson should have disqualified himself due to his stock holdings in a corporation alleged to be a part of fraudulent business activities in the case.

In a 2011 Los Angeles Times article, Anderson was criticized for extensive delays in reviewing writs of habeas corpus. In particular, Anderson was alleged to refuse to rule upon writs in which junior judicial officials have found merit to a finding in favor of prisoner release; three cases have "languished unattended" in "years-long inaction"—these three cases waiting five years or more for rulings from Anderson. Legal experts have said that the delays are "highly unusual" and critics have asserted that Anderson's handling of these cases is concerning and may warrant a misconduct inquiry.

== See also ==
- List of African-American federal judges
- List of African-American jurists

Legal offices
Preceded by Kim McLane Wardlaw	Judge of the United States District Court for the Central District of California; 2002–present	Incumbent
