= Kim McLane Wardlaw =

American judge (born 1954)

Kim Wardlaw
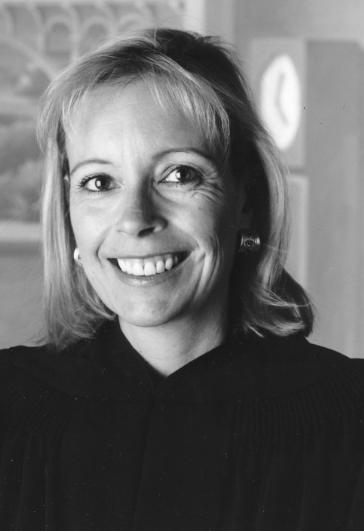

Judge of the United States Court of Appeals for the Ninth Circuit
- Incumbent
- Assumed office August 3, 1998
- Appointed by: Bill Clinton
- Preceded by: J. Clifford Wallace

Judge of the United States District Court for the Central District of California
- In office December 26, 1995 – August 3, 1998
- Appointed by: Bill Clinton
- Preceded by: David Vreeland Kenyon
- Succeeded by: Percy Anderson

Personal details
- Born: Kim Anita McLane; 1954 (age 71–72) San Francisco, California, U.S.
- Party: Democratic
- Spouse: William Wardlaw
- Children: 2
- Education: University of California, Los Angeles (BA, JD)

Kim Anita McLane Wardlaw (born 1954) is an American lawyer and jurist serving as a United States circuit judge of the United States Court of Appeals for the Ninth Circuit since 1998. She is the first Hispanic American woman to be appointed to a federal appeals court. Wardlaw was considered as a possible candidate to be nominated by Barack Obama to the Supreme Court of the United States.

== Early life and education ==
In 1954, Wardlaw was born as Kim Anita McLane in San Francisco, California. Wardlaw's father was a salesman of Scotch Irish lineage. Wardlaw's mother was Soledad Jiménez, an accountant of Mexican descent.

In 1976, Wardlaw earned a bachelor's degree in communications, summa cum laude and Phi Beta Kappa, from UCLA. In 1979, Wardlaw earned a Juris Doctor from the UCLA School of Law.

== Career ==
=== Early career ===
Wardlaw worked as a law clerk for Judge William P. Gray of the United States District Court for the Central District of California and a legal extern for Judge Joseph Tyree Sneed III of the United States Court of Appeals for the Ninth Circuit. Wardlaw joined the law firm of O'Melveny & Myers in 1980 as an associate, and worked at the firm for sixteen years, the final ten as a partner in the litigation department.

=== Political campaigning ===
Wardlaw volunteered for Bill Clinton's presidential campaign in California during the 1991–1992 election season, and later served on the Clinton-Gore presidential transition team, working with the United States Department of Justice. She was an elected delegate from the California's 27th congressional district to the 1992 Democratic National Convention. In 1993, Wardlaw served on the Executive Committee on Debate Preparation for Richard Riordan's campaign for Mayor of Los Angeles. After volunteering for Riordan's successful campaign, she worked as his Government Liaison during the mayoral transition.

=== Federal judicial service ===
President Clinton nominated Wardlaw to the United States District Court for the Central District of California on August 10, 1995. The Judiciary Committee unanimously approved her nomination, and the Senate confirmed Wardlaw on December 22, 1995, by unanimous consent. She received her judicial commission on December 26, 1995. She served on the district court until August 3, 1998 when she was elevated to the court of appeals.

Clinton nominated Wardlaw to the United States Court of Appeals for the Ninth Circuit on January 27, 1998. The Judiciary Committee approved her nomination by a 17–1 vote, and the Senate again confirmed her nomination by unanimous consent on July 31, 1998. She received her judicial commission on August 3, 1998.

== Notable cases ==
=== Jones v. City of Los Angeles ===
In 2006, Judge Wardlaw held that homeless plaintiffs could challenge an ordinance banning sleeping on the street, over the dissent of Judge Pamela Ann Rymer.

=== Redding v. Safford Unified School District ===
On July 11, 2008, Wardlaw ruled in favor of Savannah Redding, a 13-year-old girl who was strip searched because she was wrongly suspected of having drugs on her. Wardlaw, joined by Judges Pregerson, Fisher, Paez, M. Smith, and N.R. Smith, ruled that the strip search of Redding violated the 4th amendment and denied individuals conducting the strip search qualified immunity. In Safford Unified School District v. Redding, the Supreme Court affirmed the 9th circuit on the strip search violating the 4th amendment, but granted qualified immunity to the individuals conducting the strip search. Justices Ruth Bader Ginsburg & John Paul Stevens dissented from the qualified immunity ruling and voted to affirm Wardlaw's ruling in full.

=== Bryan v. McPherson ===
Wardlaw wrote the majority opinion in Bryan v. MacPherson, a case where police officers tasered a man at a traffic spot because he was not wearing a seatbelt. Wardlaw concluded that the police violated the man's 4th amendment rights, and that use of a taser can be considered excessive force. Wardlaw also wrote a concurrence in denying en banc, joined by judges Pregerson, Reinhardt, and W. Fletcher, defending her initial decision to rule against the officers.

=== Bringas-Rodriguez v. Sessions ===
On March 8, 2017, Wardlaw ruled that Carlos Bringas-Rodriguez, a gay Mexican, must be given protection from persecution, overruling Castro-Martinez v. Holder. She ruled that Bringas-Rodriguez had suffered past prosecution, as he was abused as a child based on his sexual orientation, and that the Mexican police would not investigate the abuse because of Bringas-Rodriguez's sexual orientation. Wardlaw was joined by Chief Judge Sidney Runyan Thomas, Judge William A. Fletcher, Milan Smith, Morgan Christen, John B. Owens, Michelle T. Friedland, and Senior Judge Barry G. Silverman, over the dissent of Carlos Bea who was joined by Diarmuid O'Scannlain. Richard R. Clifton concurred in the judgement but would not overrule Castro-Martinez v. Holder.

=== Ibrahim v. Department of Homeland Security ===
On January 2, 2019, Wardlaw ruled that Dr. Rahinah Ibrahim had experienced sex discrimination, and Wardlaw remanded for a recalculation of Ibrahim's fees. Wardlaw also ruled that the government may have acted in bad faith. Wardlaw was joined by Sidney Runyan Thomas, M. Margaret McKeown, William A. Fletcher, Marsha Berzon, Milan Smith, Morgan Christen, and Paul J. Watford, over the partial dissent of Consuelo Callahan who was joined by N. Randy Smith and Jacqueline Nguyen. In October 2019, the Supreme Court declined to hear the case, with Justice Samuel Alito commenting that he voted to take up the case.

=== City of Los Angeles v. Barr (Sanctuary Cities) ===
On July 12, 2019, in City of Los Angeles V. Barr, the United States Court of Appeals for the Ninth Circuit overturned a nationwide injunction issued in 2018, thus upholding preferential treatment in awarding community policing grants to cities that cooperate with immigration authorities. In the opinion, Judge Sandra Ikuta wrote, "Cooperation relating to enforcement of federal immigration law is in pursuit of the general welfare, and meets the low bar of being germane to the federal interest in providing the funding to "address crime and disorder problems, and otherwise... enhance public safety... one of the main purposes for which” the grant is intended. In her dissent, Judge Wardlaw wrote, "[The Department of Justice's] decision to implement both the illegal immigration focus area and the Cooperation Certification is foreclosed by the text, structure, and purpose of the Community Policing Act."

In July 2019, Wardlaw dissented when the 9th circuit en banc upheld Trump's gag rule which defunded abortion providers from Title X funds.

=== Tresóna v. Burbank High School ===
In March 2020, Wardlaw authored the opinion of the court on Tresóna Multimedia v. Burbank High School Vocal Music Ass'n, which held the school choir's usage of the song Magic was fair use, and that the school should be awarded attorney's fees due to Tresóna's "overreaching claims of copyright infringement".

Wardlaw wrote that

Tresóna did more than simply pursue an aggressive litigation strategy. It sued a public school teacher, a not-for-profit Boosters Club, and parent volunteers. [...] None of these actions furthers the purposes of the Copyright Act. Courts have a legitimate interest in deterring the type of litigation conduct in which Tresóna engaged, and in compensating those who have been harmed by such conduct. [...] Awarding Defendants their attorneys' fees insures that they are properly compensated for defending against overreaching claims of copyright infringement and pressing a defense that benefits those educating our youth. An award of attorneys' fees here assures that "an overzealous monopolist [cannot] use his copyright to stamp out the very creativity that the [Copyright] Act seeks to ignite," allowing for greater breathing room for classroom educators and those involved in similar educational extracurricular activities.

—

=== Center for Investigative Reporting v. DOJ ===
On September 23, 2021, Wardlaw, joined by Milan Smith, ordered the DOJ to publicize records regarding the number of weapons that were formerly owned by law enforcement. The basis for this decision was the Freedom of Information Act.

=== Okonowsky v. Garland ===
On July 25, 2024, Wardlaw reinstated a hostile work environment lawsuit. The lawsuit had been filed by a staff psychologist working for a federal prison who discovered that a corrections lieutenant was sexually harassing her via social media.

=== Election Integrity Project v. Weber ===
On August 15, 2024, Wardlaw wrote for a unanimous panel ruling that California's vote-by-mail system was constitutional.

== Personal life ==
Wardlaw's husband is William Wardlaw. They have two children, William, Jr. and Katherine Ann. Since 2009, Wardlaw and her family have resided in Pasadena, California.

Wardlaw established the Soledad Jiménez McLane Scholarship Fund, in honor of her mother, for disadvantaged Latino children in the San Gabriel Valley at the Mayfield School, in Pasadena, California.

== Awards ==
- "2010 Women of Excellence Award" by YMCA Pasadena-Foothill Valley
- "2010 La Raza Alumna of the Year Award" by UCLA La Raza Law Students Association
- "2009 Ernestine Stalhut Award" by Women Lawyers Association of Los Angeles
- "2008 Judicial Award" by Hispanic National Bar Foundation
- "2005 Maynard Toll Award for Distinguished Public Service" by Los Angeles Legal Aid Foundation
- "2004 Alumni of the Year Award for Public and Community Service" by UCLA Law School
- "2001 Professional Achievement Award" by Mexican American Bar Foundation
- "2000 Honorary Doctor of Humane Letters by Mount St. Mary's College
- "1995 Buddy Award" by National Organization for Women Legal Defense and Education Fund
- "1995 100 Most Prominent Business Attorneys in Los Angeles County" by Los Angeles Business Journal
- "1993 Top 25 Lawyers Under 45" by California Law Business Journal

== Publications ==
- "Umpires, Empathy, and Activism: Lessons from Judge Cardozo", 85 Notre Dame L. Rev. 1629 (2010)
- "Introduction", 40 Golden Gate U. L. Rev. 293 (2010)
- "Access to State-Owned Communications Media—The Public Forum Doctrine" (Comment), 26 UCLA L. Rev. 1410 (1979)

== See also ==
- Barack Obama Supreme Court candidates
- List of first women lawyers and judges in California
- List of first women lawyers and judges in the United States
- List of Hispanic and Latino American jurists

Legal offices
Preceded by David Vreeland Kenyon	Judge of the United States District Court for the Central District of California; 1995–1998	Succeeded by Percy Anderson
Preceded by J. Clifford Wallace	Judge of the United States Court of Appeals for the Ninth Circuit; 1998–present	Incumbent
