= Bryan v. MacPherson =

2009 U.S. legal decision on use of Taser

- Court: United States Court of Appeals for the Ninth Circuit
- Full case name: Carl Bryan v. Brian MacPherson, Coronado Police Department, City of Coronado
- Decided: October 9, 2009
- Citation: 630 F.3d 805; 2010 Daily Journal D.A.R. 17,910

Court membership
- Judges sitting: Kim McLane Wardlaw, Harry Pregerson, Stephen Reinhardt

Bryan v. McPherson, 630 F.3d 805 (9th Cir. 2009), was heard by United States Court of Appeals for the Ninth Circuit in October 2009. Plaintiff-appellee Carl Bryan was tasered by defendant-appellant Officer Brian MacPherson after being pulled over to the side of the road for failure to wear a seat belt. The case considered whether MacPherson's use of a taser during a routine traffic stop violated Bryan's Fourth Amendment rights. The majority opinion, written by Kim McLane Wardlaw, declared that the use of the taser in this situation could be considered excessive force. Richard Tallman and Consuelo María Callahan wrote the dissent. This case affirmed that this use of a taser could indeed be considered excessive force.

== Facts ==
In the summer of 2005, 21-year-old Carl Bryan planned to drive his brother from their cousin's home in Ventura County back to his parents' home in San Diego County. That day, due to certain events, Bryan was greatly upset. His cousin's girlfriend had accidentally taken his keys to Los Angeles and Bryan, wearing the boxers and shirt that he had slept in, had to drive there in order to pick up the keys. He then drove back to Ventura and picked up his car and brother. While traveling on the 405, Bryan was stopped by a California Highway Patrol officer and issued a speeding ticket. He began crying, moping, and removed his T-shirt to wipe his face. Bryan and his brother then continued south and crossed the Coronado Bridge at about 7:30 a.m.

At that point, Officer Brian MacPherson of the Coronado Police Department stopped Bryan at an intersection where he had been stationed to enforce seatbelt regulations. Bryan had failed to buckle his seatbelt after the earlier traffic stop by the CHP officer. MacPherson approached Bryans' window and asked if he knew why he had been stopped. Bryan did not answer. MacPherson requested that Bryan turn down his radio and pull over to the curb. Bryan complied with both requests, but angrily hit the steering wheel and yelled expletives to himself in the process. MacPherson testified that he told Bryan to remain in the car, while Bryan testified he did not hear that. Standing outside of the car, approximately 20–25 feet away from MacPherson, Bryan began jumping up and down in the middle of the street with clenched fists. Bryan claimed he struck himself on his thighs because he was angry at himself. He was clad only in his boxer shorts and tennis shoes, and claimed he was yelling gibberish to himself.

It was undisputed that Bryan did not verbally threaten MacPherson; however, the parties provided conflicting testimony regarding whether Bryan made any movement towards MacPherson: MacPherson testified that Bryan took "one step" toward him, while Bryan testified he made no such advancement. Without giving any warning, MacPherson shot Bryan with his department-issued taser gun, a device designed to fire a dart up to ½ inch into bare skin and deliver a 1200-volt charge. Immobilized by the electric shock, Bryan fell face first to the ground, fracturing four teeth and suffering numerous facial contusions.

The physical evidence of blood on the pavement indicated Bryan fell away from Officer MacPherson, and thus was not moving toward him. He was arrested and an ambulance took him to the hospital. Bryan was charged with resisting and opposing an officer in the performance of his duties in violation of California Penal Code § 148. Bryan was tried on this violation, but following a hung jury, the state dismissed the charges.

== Procedural history ==
On July 24, 2006, Bryan filed suit against Officer MacPherson, the Coronado Police Department, its police chief, and the City of Coronado for excessive force in violation of 42 U.S.C. § 1983, assault and battery, intentional infliction of emotional distress, a violation of California Civil code § 52.1, as well as failure to train and related causes of action. The U.S. District Court for the Southern District of California granted summary judgment to the City of Coronado and the Coronado Police Department on the basis of qualified immunity. The District Court denied summary judgment for MacPherson on the basis that he was not entitled to qualified immunity. He filed an interlocutory appeal on the denial of summary judgement to the Court of Appeals for the Ninth Circuit, arguing that he was entitled to qualified immunity because "the use of one single, properly-administered deployment of a non-deadly taser to subdue a person behaving as violently and irrationally as Bryan...[was] reasonable under the Fourth Amendment."

On December 28, 2009, a three-judge panel of the Ninth Circuit affirmed the District Court. On June 18, 2010, the three-judge panel entered a superseding opinion, reversing the District's denial of summary judgement on the basis of qualified immunity, holding, inter alia that MacPherson's use of a taser did not violate clearly established Fourth Amendment rights. On November 30, 2010, the three-judge panel entered a second superseding opinion and unanimously denied the Petition for Panel Rehearing and the Petition for Rehearing En Banc. In addition, a vote on whether to rehear the case en banc failed to receive a majority of votes by the active judges.

== Majority opinion ==
The majority opinion, authored by Justice Kim McLane Wardlaw, held that MacPherson applied excessive force when he used his X26 taser in dart mode to apprehend Bryan. The Court noted that Bryan was obviously and noticeably unarmed and did not resist arrest or attempt to flee. On the issue of whether Bryan made a step toward MacPherson, the Court found that the parties' conflicting testimony was a genuine dispute of material fact and, applying the standard of review, assumed Bryan's version was true and that he did not take a step toward the officer. The Court's decision reasoned that MacPherson's X26 taser (and similar devices), when used in dart mode, is considered an "intermediate, significant level of force that must be justified by the governmental interest involved." However, the Court ultimately concluded that MacPherson was entitled to qualified immunity from Bryan's lawsuit, as this principle hadn't been established in 2005 when the incident occurred.

== Implications ==
This case effectively announced a general legal rule and the constitutional regulation of a new technology. The principle has now been established that an X26 taser and similar devices, when used in dart mode, constitute an "intermediate, significant level of force that must be justified by the governmental interest involved."

This particular taser case is significant in that it placed the taser at a higher level of force than most law enforcement agencies and the International Association of Chiefs of Police had placed them. Some speculate that, as a result, Bryan v. MacPherson may affect police training and taserings of suspects by California police officers, and that similar challenges to taser usage will crop up in other states.

The "less intrusive means" language has never been an element of use of force analysis by the United States Supreme Court and is contrary the other United States circuits. There are cases within the United States Court of appeals for the Ninth Circuit where this type of analysis has been rejected. For example, in Forrett v. Richardson, 112 F.3d 416, 420 (9th Cir. 1997), the court held that, contrary to Williams' (Williams v. Holt 2006 U.S. Dist. LEXIS 551) exhaust-other means argument, "the Fourth Amendment does not require law enforcement officers to exhaust every alternative before using justifiable deadly force." See also Deering v. Reich, 183 F.3d 645, 652-53 (7th Cir. 1999)(same). As the United States Court of Appeals for the Sixth Circuit ("Sixth Circuit") has said: "The fourth amendment reasonableness standard does not turn on the availability of less intrusive alternatives" Collins v. Nagle, 892 F.2d 489, 493 (6th Cir. 1989).

The case also established that the use of a taser requires a strong government interest that this opinion indicates is "an immediate threat" by the subject to the officer. The court found facts, which many officers would consider threatening to not qualify as an imminent threat, such as taking one step forward when the person is still twenty feet away. An officer must consider the totality of the circumstances, including whether the subject poses an immediate threat to safety, whether he is actively resisting arrest, the severity of the crime at issue, and whether he is attempting to evade seizure by flight. A takeaway from the court's analysis is that an officer's warning is important and should be done unless exigent circumstances exist. They should assess whether their warnings are clearly heard and understood and give a reasonable time for volitional compliance.

Recent negative media attention related to law enforcement's improper use of Tasers has brought to light the tragic effect on victims, the costs to the justice system, and other detrimental externalities. Some suggest that Bryan may provide the legal framework and the necessary incentive to diminish, if not eliminate, improper police use of tasers.

== Legal criticism and praise ==
The Volokh Conspiracy Blog's writeup is overall critical of the decision, with the argument broken down into five main points. Orin S. Kerr, the writer, said he was surprised at the opinion's focus on the perspective of the driver rather than the police officer. The blog describes that while the flow makes for an "engaging" read from a literary perspective, this manner of describing the case makes it ambiguous to determine the legality from how the facts appeared to the officer on the scene. Next, Kerr writes how the ruling on tasers is based on a limited summary judgment record, arguing that the case uses very specific facts to draw "a general Fourth Amendment rule that going forward regulates the use of tasers." The third criticism Kerr makes of the case is how the court dealt with whether Bryan was posing a threat to the officer. As Kerr writes, the facts make it seem as though Bryan did indeed pose a threat, which is somewhat made light of by the court. The fourth point Kerr makes is that the case overly focuses on the minor nature of the traffic violation that led to the traffic stop. Kerr argues that instead, more focus should be put on the threat the man posed to the officer, rather than what led to the situation. Finally, Kerr describes how the qualified immunity analysis was "fairly sparse," stating that such a standard is extremely hard to gauge and overly general to use to interpret the case.

An article in the Bay Area The Informant, calls the decision "landmark," and is intrigued to see how it will affect future police training. The California Appellate Report, a blog written by University of San Diego School of Law Professor Shaun Martin, seems to poke fun at Judge Wardlaw's writing style, describing how she writes the decision "like a novel." He saves special compliments for her use of "California Sunday" as a description in her decision.

== See also ==
- Death of Otto Zehm
- Rodney King

=== Related cases ===
- Graham v. Connor
- Tennessee v. Garner
