= William A. Fletcher =

American judge (born 1945)

William Fletcher
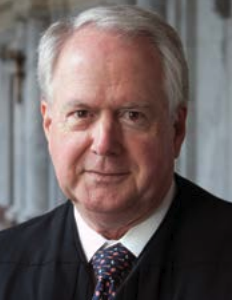

Senior Judge of the United States Court of Appeals for the Ninth Circuit
- Incumbent
- Assumed office January 24, 2022

Judge of the United States Court of Appeals for the Ninth Circuit
- In office October 9, 1998 – January 24, 2022
- Appointed by: Bill Clinton
- Preceded by: William Albert Norris
- Succeeded by: Holly A. Thomas

Personal details
- Born: William Alan Fletcher; June 6, 1945 (age 81) Philadelphia, Pennsylvania, U.S.
- Party: Democratic
- Relatives: Betty Binns Fletcher (mother)
- Education: Harvard University (BA); Merton College, Oxford (BA); Yale University (JD)

William Alan Fletcher (born June 6, 1945) is a senior United States circuit judge of the United States Court of Appeals for the Ninth Circuit. Appointed by President Bill Clinton, Fletcher was confirmed by the U.S. Senate in 1998. Fletcher is a professor emeritus at the UC Berkeley School of Law, where he teaches federal courts.

== Early life and education ==
Fletcher went to Roosevelt High School in Seattle, Washington, graduating in 1964. Fletcher received a Bachelor of Arts degree from Harvard University in 1968 and another from Merton College, Oxford, in 1970 as a Rhodes Scholar. He earned his Juris Doctor from Yale Law School in 1975. He clerked for Judge Stanley Alexander Weigel of the United States District Court for the Northern District of California from 1975 to 1976. Fletcher then clerked for Justice William J. Brennan Jr. of the United States Supreme Court from 1976 to 1977.

Fletcher's mother, Betty Binns Fletcher, was also a judge on the Ninth Circuit, although she held senior status from 1998 until her death in 2012.

== Professional career ==
Fletcher was a Lieutenant in the United States Navy from 1970 to 1972 and a professor of law at UC Berkeley School of Law from 1977 to 1998. Fletcher was the author of the Ninth Circuit's decision in Demers v. Austin (January 2014). He also published a 100-page dissent on the decision to deny Kevin Cooper an en banc hearing.

== Federal judicial service ==
Fletcher was nominated twice by former President Bill Clinton, his Rhodes Scholar classmate at Oxford, for a seat on the Ninth Circuit in April 1995, and on January 7, 1997, vacated by William Albert Norris. His first nomination was never voted on by the Senate, but his second nomination was confirmed by a 57–41 vote on October 8, 1998. He received his commission on October 9, 1998.

On May 18, 2021, Fletcher announced that he would assuming senior status upon the appointment of his successor. He assumed senior status on January 24, 2022.

== Judicial philosophy ==
Fletcher is seen as a pragmatist on the court. When Fletcher makes a decision, he looks at both the facts of the case and the legal reasoning behind his decision. Fletcher reported in an interview that "[p]robably the most important thing, beyond the obvious need for legal education of judges, is the development of a culture of decision making. By this I mean a judicial culture in which it is expected that judges will—to the extent of their ability and to the extent human nature will permit—state carefully, fully, and honestly the factual and legal bases for their decisions. I make no claim that American judges always live up to that ideal. We do not. But we try."

In October 2013, Fletcher delivered the 2013 Madison Lecture, "Our Broken Death Penalty". Fletcher was very critical of the death penalty, saying the title "suggests that it might have been unbroken. I think it's always been broken." In November 2014, in another speech Fletcher mentioned "The death penalty may not discourage criminals from committing murder and is very expensive."

== Statistics ==
Between December 2014 and August 2020, Fletcher sat on 34 en banc panels, tied for the most out of any judge excluding Chief Judge Thomas, who sits on every en banc panel. Fletcher also tied for most en banc majority opinions written during that time period, having written four. Fletcher agreed with Chief Judge Thomas 97% of the time, while he agreed with Judge Callahan 45% of the time and Judge Ikuta only 38% of the time (in which Fletcher and the respective judge were on en banc panels together).

== Notable rulings ==
Fletcher has made rulings on feminism, abortion, gun control, and the conditions of detainees at the border.

=== 1st amendment ===
In Thunder Studios v. Kazal (9th Cir. 2021), decided on September 15, 2021, Fletcher ruled that the speech of Tarek ("Tony") and Adam Kazal, which included hiring protestors, organizing leafletting, hiring a van to drive around Los Angeles with a message on its side, and publishing emails to make the public aware of Thunder Studios' business practices is protected by the 1st amendment even though the Kazals were not in the United States at "all relevant times".

=== 2nd amendment ===
In 2016, Fletcher wrote the majority opinion in Peruta v. San Diego County, ruling that the Second Amendment did not protect the right to carry a concealed weapon. The San Diego ban on concealed weapons was upheld by a vote of 7–4.

=== Abortion ===
On June 3, 2014, Fletcher blocked an Arizona abortion law that effectively prohibited all medication abortions.

In July 2019, Fletcher dissented when the 9th Circuit upheld the "gag rule" restricting abortion funding by a vote of 7–4. On February 24, 2020, he was one of four judges who voted strike down the gag rule in the same 7-4 split.

=== Consumer protection ===
On June 15, 2023, Fletcher wrote the majority opinion upholding a Nevada law requiring medical debt collectors to provide written notification to debtors 60 days before taking any action to collect the medical debt.

=== Death penalty ===
On May 11, 2009, Fletcher wrote a 101-page dissent when the 9th Circuit allowed the execution of Kevin Cooper to go forward. Fletcher asserted that Cooper may have been innocent and was denied a fair trial. Fletcher also reasoned that Cooper may have been treated unfairly due to his race, and accused Judge Marilyn Huff (who had denied Cooper's appeal) of intentionally sabotaging Cooper's hearing. He was joined by Judges Harry Pregerson, Stephen Reinhardt, Richard Paez, and Johnnie B. Rawlinson. Six other judges also dissented and agreed or mostly agreed with Fletcher's reasoning: Alex Kozinski, Sidney R. Thomas, Susan P. Graber, Raymond C. Fisher, Marsha Berzon, and Kim McLane Wardlaw

On December 29, 2015, Fletcher blocked a death sentence due to it being in violation of Roper v. Simmons, and argued that Roper applied retroactively. Fletcher was joined by Sidney R. Thomas, Kim McLane Wardlaw, Marsha Berzon, Morgan Christen, and Jacqueline Nguyen, over a dissent by Carlos Bea who argued that Roper did not apply retroactively.

=== Environmental issues ===
On July 10, 2013, Fletcher was one of six judges who voted to rehear Shell Offshore v. Greenpeace en banc. The six judges in a dissent agreed with Greenpeace's argument that the injunction Shell won against Greenpeace's protests violated Greenpeace's 1st amendment rights.

On August 3, 2020, Fletcher wrote the majority opinion in EPIC v. Ann Carlson. The ruling prevented private loggers from removing large fire-damaged trees from up to 200 feet from either side of the road in Mendocino National Forest, which would have burned an estimated 288,000 acres. In oral arguments, Fletcher expressed concern for the environment, and reiterated John T. Noonan's argument that the forest service was cutting trees only for monetary gain. Fletcher also explained why the chances of a tree falling into the road is minimal, concluding "First it has to die. Then it has to fall over in the direction of the road."

In a September 16, 2021 ruling, Fletcher vacated an EPA permit regulating underground discharges. His ruling declared the permit "arbitrary and capricious" because the EPA had no way of monitoring such discharges, thus making the regulation impossible to enforce.

On July 31, 2023, Fletcher (joined by Gould) ruled that it is within the EPA's powers to require San Francisco to update its long-term control plan for sewer overflow. The case, City and County of San Francisco v. EPA, is being heard by the Supreme Court.

=== Gender equality ===
On April 14, 2006, Fletcher dissented in Jespersen v. Harrah's Operating Co. when the Ninth Circuit en banc ruled that a casino can require female workers to wear makeup.

On April 9, 2018, Fletcher was one of six judges who ruled that using one's prior salary to determine their current salary violates the Equal Pay Act, and that prior pay is not a "factor other than sex". However, that opinion was vacated by the Supreme Court in Yovino v. Rizo due to the death of Stephen Reinhardt, the author of the majority opinion. On February 27, 2020, Fletcher was in a different 6-judge bloc that effectively came to the same conclusion as the bloc led by Reinhardt.

=== Immigration ===
On May 10, 2019, in a concurrence in a case where the 9th Circuit permitted Trump to make asylum seekers wait in Mexico for immigration proceedings in court, Fletcher said of the Trump administration "I am hopeful that the regular argument panel that will ultimately hear the appeal, with the benefit of full briefing and regularly scheduled argument, will be able to see the Government's arguments for what they are -- baseless arguments in support of an illegal policy that will, if sustained, require bona fide asylum applicants to wait in Mexico for years while their applications are adjudicated."

On November 19, 2019, Fletcher granted relief to an immigrant, Vega-Anguiano, on the grounds that his 1998 removal order lacked a valid legal basis and the reinstatement order was improper. Judge Morgan Christen concurred, noting that Vega-Anguiano could not have known that he needed to bring these errors to the agency's attention. Judge Consuelo Callahan would have denied relief.

On February 28, 2020, Fletcher, who was joined by Paez, ruled that asylum seekers could not be forced to be wait in Mexico while their hearings proceeded, mentioning that court proceedings often take years. However, on March 4, Fletcher and Paez narrowed the ruling to California and Arizona, letting the Supreme Court decide the rest. However, the Supreme Court reversed Fletcher's ruling on March 11, allowing Trump's "Remain-in-Mexico" policy to continue.

In East Bay Sanctuary Covenant v. Barr (9th Cir. Jul. 6, 2020), Fletcher wrote the Court's opinion, ruling that the Department of Homeland Security (DHS) rule that "categorically denies asylum to aliens arriving at our border with Mexico unless they have first applied for, and have been denied, asylum in Mexico or another country through which they have traveled" exceeds the power that Congress gave federal agencies. Fletcher's opinion was 44 pages long.

On October 10, 2025, Fletcher and Lucy Koh wrote a concurring opinion when the full 9th circuit declined to visit their previous ruling blocking the Trump administration from cutting legal aid for children in immigration proceedings.

=== Labor law ===
On January 16, 2025, Fletcher ruled that the GEO Group violated Washington's Minimum Wage Act when it paid employeed civil detainees between $1 and $5 per day. Fletcher's ruling found that the GEO Group's contract with ICE requires that it pay minimum wage to detained employees.

On February 26, 2025, Fletcher, joined by Jennifer Sung and Jed Rakoff, reinstated a lawsuit filed by Dawn Lui, an employee of the United States Postal Service in Washington who alleged that her demotion had been a result of racial and gender discrimination. The 9th circuit ruling found that Lui had met the four conditions needed to establish a prima facie case and had exhausted her administrative remedies. However, the ruling rejected Lui's claims regarding retaliation. Ultimately, Fletcher's ruling remanded the case to the district court to determine whether Lui had faced a hostile work environment.

Then, in May 2025, Fletcher blocked the Trump administration from implementing mass layoffs.

=== LGBTQ+ rights ===
On September 24, 2002, Fletcher authored the plurality opinion in a 7-4 ruling that held that Title VII of the Civil Rights Act protects gay workers from sexual harassment.

=== Public charge rule ===
On April 8, 2021, Fletcher was one of two judges on the 9th circuit who blocked Republican states from reviving the "public charge" rule. The public charge rule was meant to deny legal status and work permits to noncitizens if they received public benefits (such as food stamps or Medicaid). In January 2020, the Supreme Court had upheld the public charge rule in a 5–4 decision, but rescinded its order when the Biden administration took action to repeal the rule. 14 Republican-led states then sued, saying that the Biden administration failed to follow proper procedure when rescinding the law. The public charge rule, and therefore this ruling, affects approximately 382,000 of the 544,000 legal immigrants who apply for green cards every year.

=== Qualified immunity ===
On December 24, 2019, Fletcher concurred in a ruling against police immunity. However, he criticized the Supreme Court's 1995 case Johnson v. Jones, writing "I hope that the Supreme Court will revisit the issue soon and will disavow Johnson entirely. But until that happens, I believe that we are, unfortunately, bound to follow what remains of Johnson."

On November 20, 2020, Fletcher ruled that a Bivens claim can be used to collect damages against Border Patrol officers for Fourth Amendment violations. In this case, a Border Patrol officer used excessive force against the plaintiff, who is a United States citizen, on his own property near the U.S.-Canada border. On May 20, 2021, the 9th circuit denied an en banc rehearing in this case, although 12 of the 29 active judges dissented. This ruling was reversed by the Supreme Court in Egbert v. Boule.

On May 11, 2021, Fletcher "strongly but respectfully" dissented in Nieves-Martinez v. United States. Armando Nieves-Martinez, "the patriarch of a Mexican family with a prosperous grape-growing business in Sonora, Mexico", made a false confession about having drugs when the Border Patrol threatened to imprison his wife and children. The Border Patrol did not follow proper procedure when testing for methamphetamine in Nieves's car, and Nieves sued for damages, claiming negligence, false imprisonment, and emotional distress, among other things. The majority held that the discretionary function exception barred Nieves's suit under the Federal Tort Claims Act. Fletcher wrote dissented.

=== Title IX ===
In Brown v. State of Arizona (decided January 25, 2022), Fletcher "strongly but respectfully" dissented when Mackenzie Brown and other sexual assault victims sued the University of Arizona for mishandling the situation. Fletcher reasoned that "Rodriguez testified in his deposition that the football team had a zero-tolerance policy for violence against women. He testified that a player’s violence against women would lead to immediate dismissal from the team. Rodriguez testified that the “first time” he heard about Bradford “Had University Title IX officials informed Rodriguez of Bradford’s assaults on Student A and DeGroote during his freshman year, Bradford would never have been permitted to live off campus, and his September 12 and 13 assaults on Brown at his off-campus house would never have occurred."

On September 25, 2023, Fletcher wrote for the 8-3 majority ruling in favor of Mackenzie Brown, reversing the original panel's holding.

=== Voting rights ===
On January 27, 2020, Fletcher wrote for the majority (in a 7-4 decision) that Arizona's policy of not counting ballots filed in the wrong precinct is unconstitutional under Section 2 of the Voting Rights Act of 1965. Fletcher also ruled that Arizona had not carried its burden of showing that racial discrimination was not a factor in the making of this policy. Fletcher used a map (see page 17 of his opinion) to show why voters of Native American and Hispanic descent were far more likely to file a ballot at the wrong precinct, whether intentional (for convenience) or not. He also explained the longtime history of racial discrimination in Arizona. He also showed a graph showing the data of rejected out-of-precinct ballots as a share of in-person ballots by state. The data, which is from a 2012 EAC report, shows that Arizona is an outlier, with over 1.5 percent of in-person ballots being rejected because they are out of precinct. No other state has more than 0.5 percent of in-person ballots rejected because they are out-of-precinct. (see page 13 of his opinion). Fletcher's opinion totaled 107 pages in length. Fletcher's ruling was stayed by the U.S. Supreme Court and was considered in Brnovich v. Democratic National Committee. On July 1, 2021, about a year and a half later, the Supreme Court reversed the 9th circuit's position and upheld the Arizona law in a 6–3 decision along ideological lines. Justice Kagan, who wrote the dissenting opinion, used a graph of the same 2012 EAC report that Fletcher included in his opinion (see page 31 of Kagan's dissenting opinion).

=== Other rulings ===
On August 12, 2019, Fletcher ruled that an animal does not constitute an "individual".

On August 28, 2019, Fletcher reversed a district court order allowing the government to seize funds from a pre-trial detainee's trust account to be applied to an outstanding restitution payment, ruling that they could not.

== See also ==
- List of law clerks for the third seat of the Supreme Court of the United States

Legal offices
| Preceded by William Albert Norris | Judge of the United States Court of Appeals for the Ninth Circuit; 1998–2022 | Succeeded by Holly A. Thomas |
