= Forever 21 =

American fast-fashion retailer

- Trade name: Forever 21
- Type: Subsidiary
- Industry: Apparel
- Founded: April 16, 1984; 42 years ago in Highland Park, California
- Founders: Do Won Chang and Jin Sook Chang
- Defunct: May 1, 2025; 18 months ago
- Fate: Chapter 11 Bankruptcy Liquidation
- Headquarters: Los Angeles, California, United States
- Number of locations: 540 (2025)
- Area served: United States and Canada
- Key people: Winnie Park (CEO)
- Products: Clothing, accessories
- Number of employees: 43,000 (2019)
- Parent: SPARC Group (2020-2025)
- Subsidiaries: Forever 21 International; Forever 21; F21 Red; XXI Forever; Love 21; Riley Rose
- Website: www.forever21.com

Forever 21 was a multinational fast-fashion retailer. It was originally founded as Fashion 21 in Highland Park, Los Angeles, in 1984. Before its closure in the US, it was owned and operated by the SPARC Group, with about 540 outlets until it filed for Chapter 11 Bankruptcy in 2025. It now operates online only and through JCPenney.

The company sells accessories, beauty products, home goods, and clothing for women, men and children. The company has been involved in various controversies that include labor practice issues and copyright infringement accusations. It is also still operating in Mexico, and other countries.

== History ==
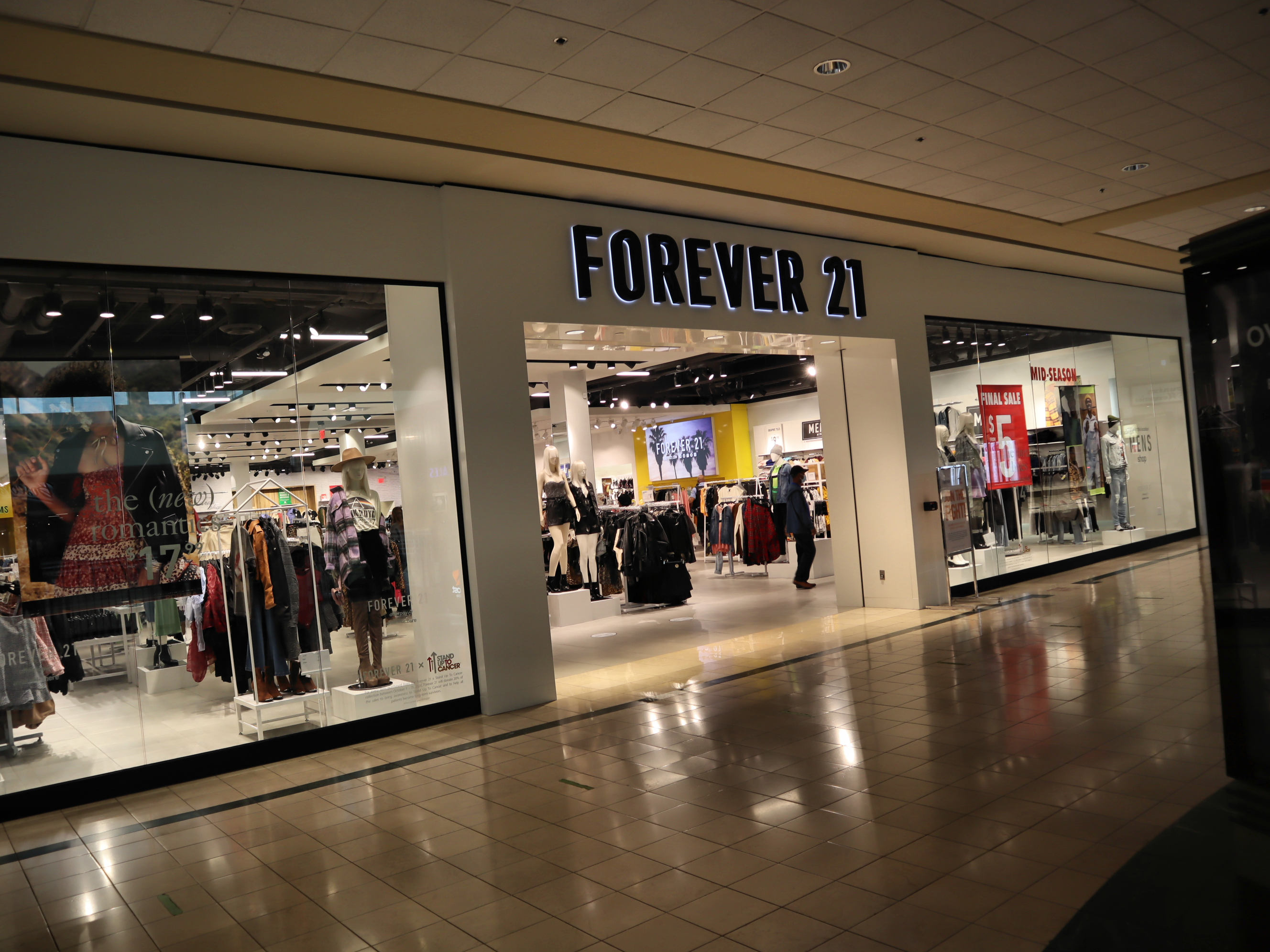
Forever 21 in Lehigh Valley Mall in Whitehall Township, Pennsylvania, October 2020

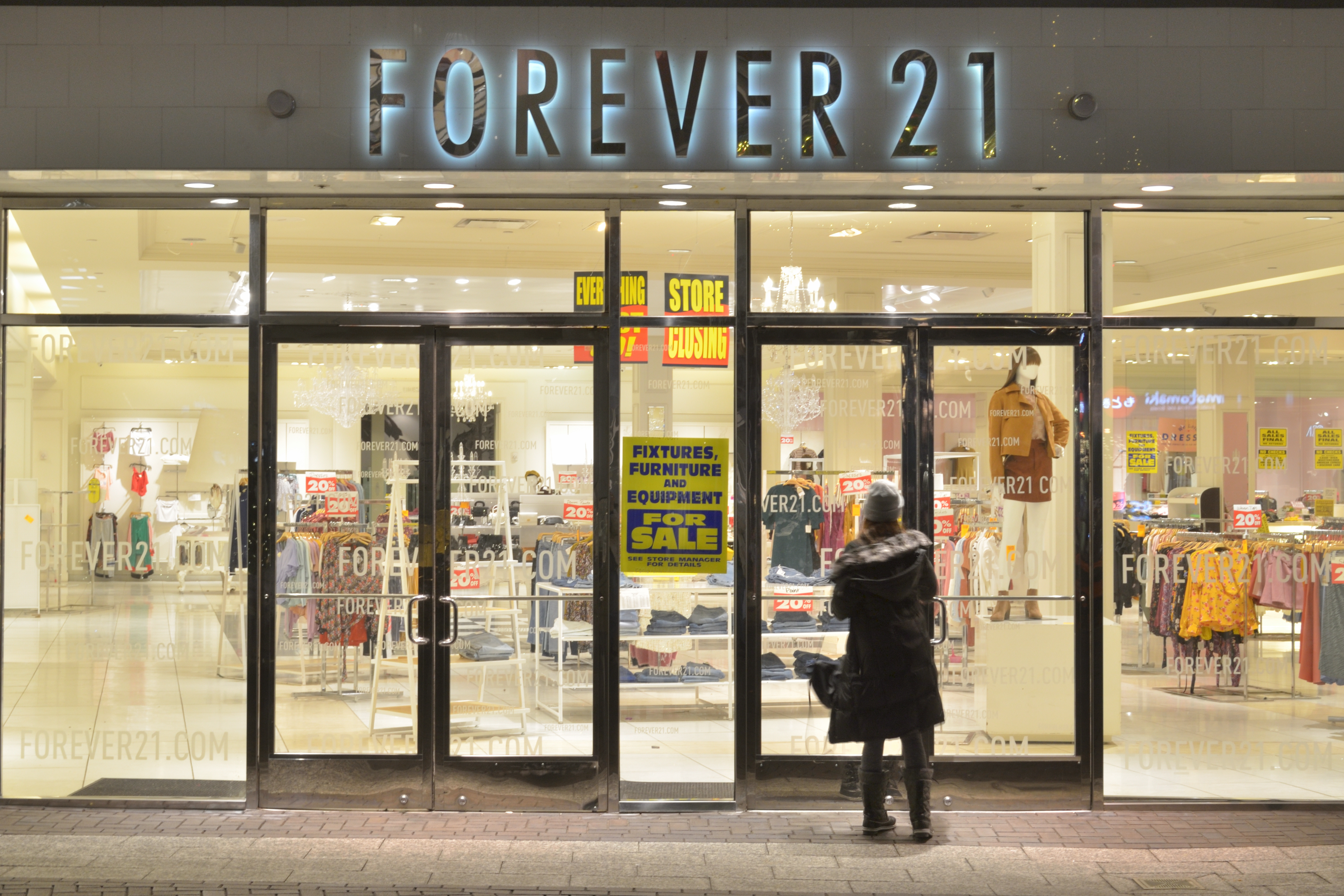
Forever 21 at Denver Pavilions in Denver during liquidation in November 2019

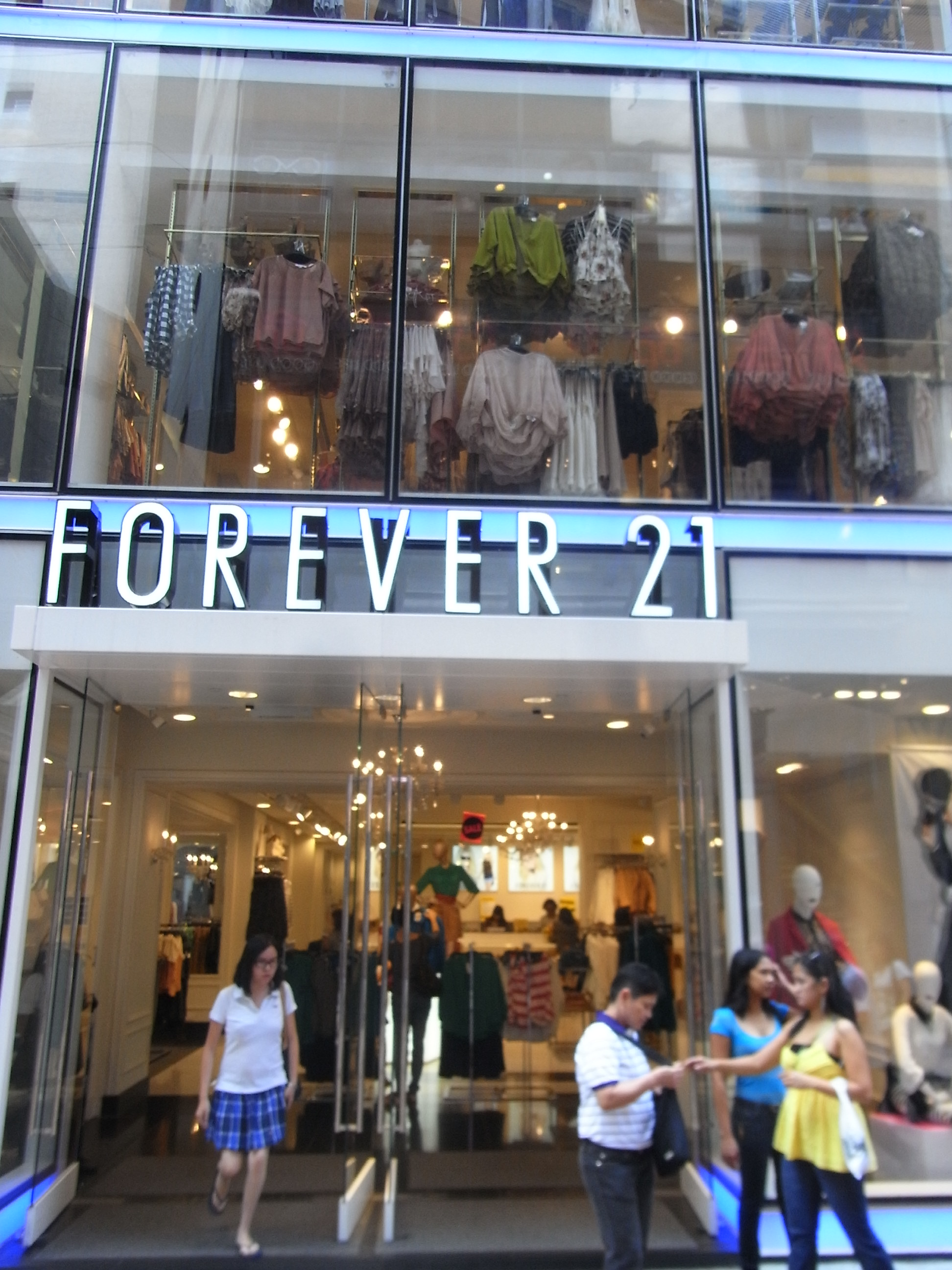
Forever 21 in Hong Kong, August 2012

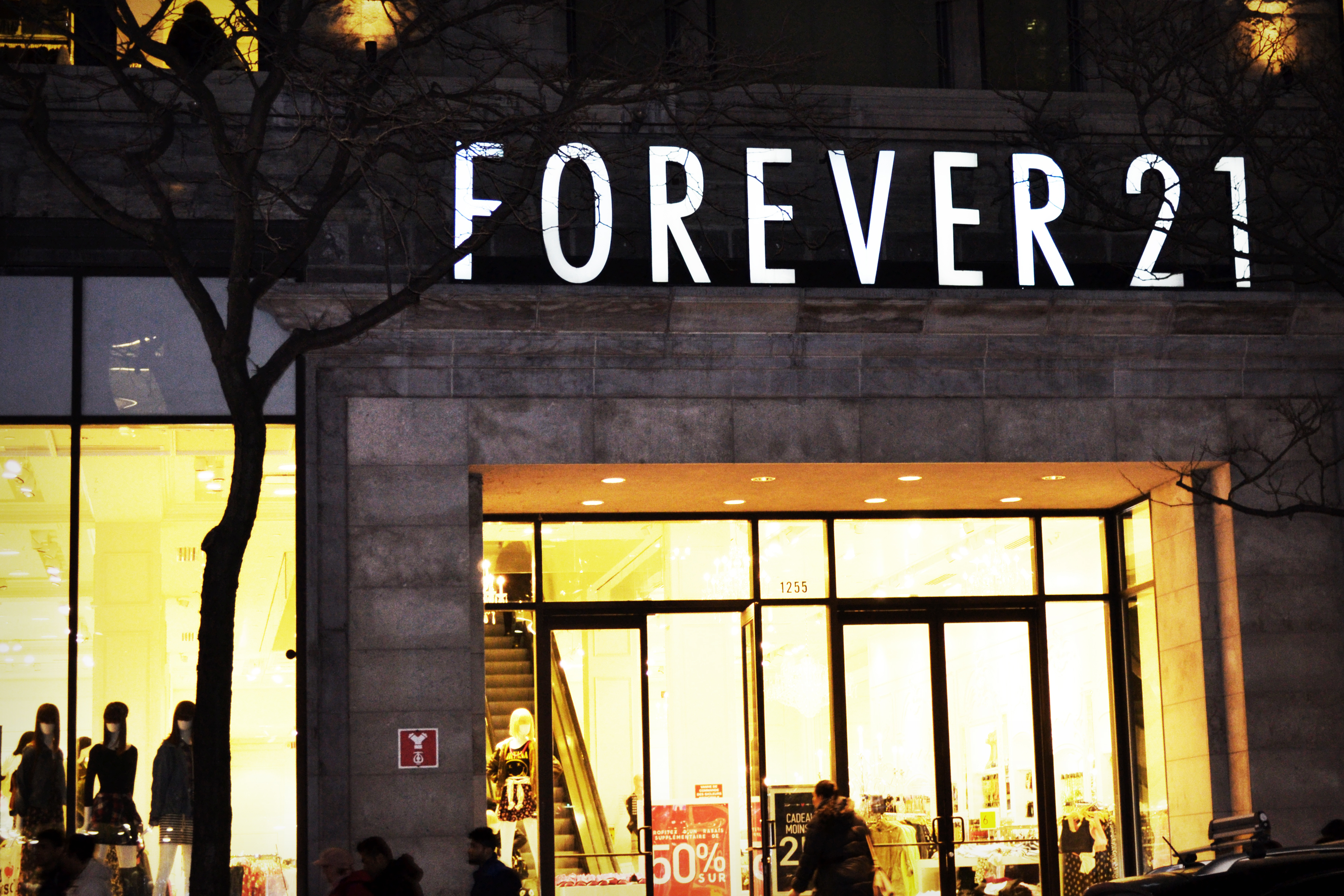
Forever 21 in Montreal, March 2014

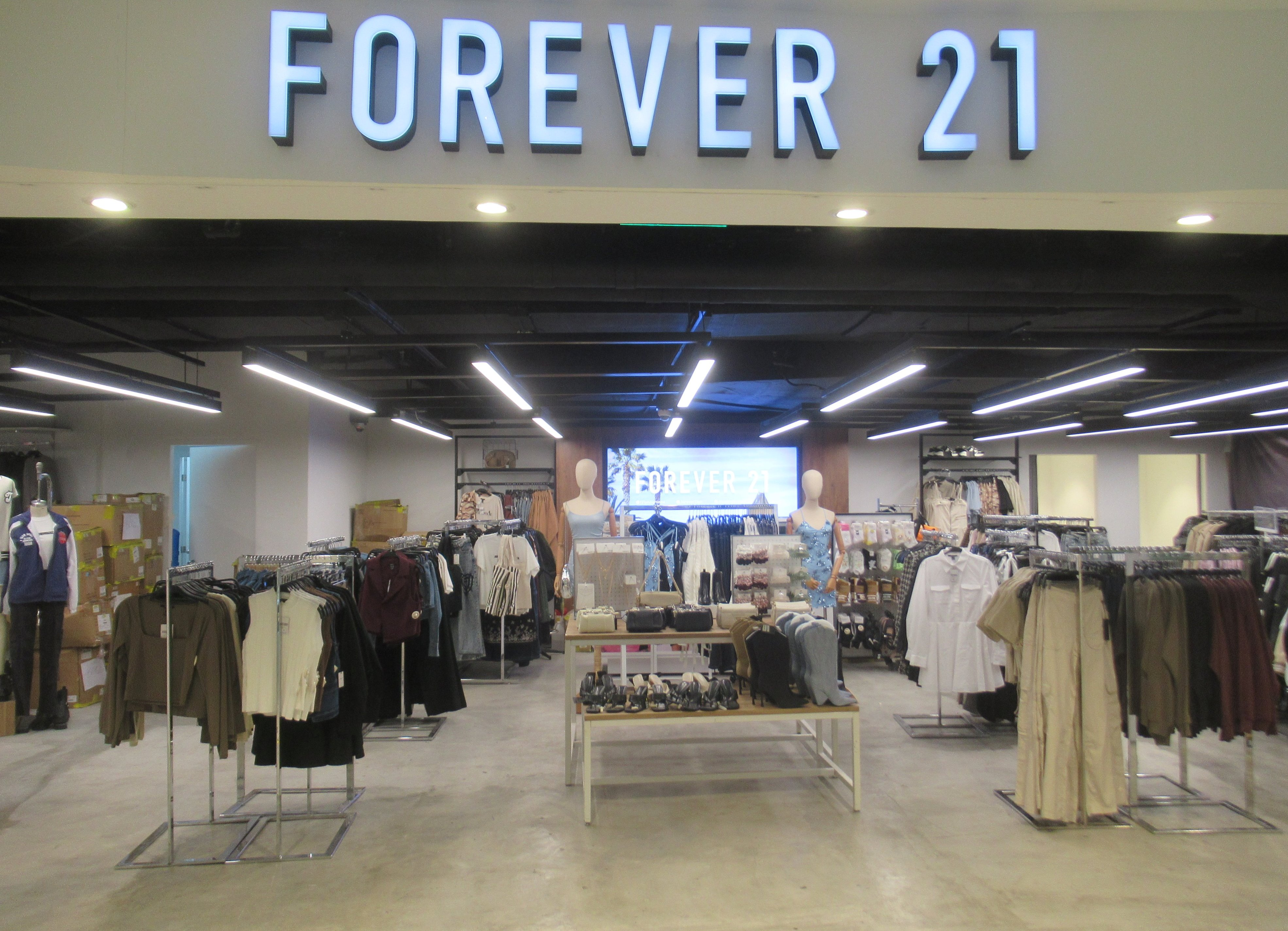
Forever 21 at SM Megamall in the Philippines, December 2024

=== 1984–2017: Founding and expansion ===
Originally known as Fashion 21, the store was founded in Los Angeles on April 16, 1984, by Do Won Chang and Jin Sook Chang, married immigrants from South Korea. The original 900 square feet (84 m^{2}) store was located at 5637 N. Figueroa Street in the Highland Park district of Los Angeles. Funded with $11,000 in savings, designs similar to those seen in South Korea were sold to and targeted at the Los Angeles Korean American community. Merchandise was acquired at wholesale closeouts from manufacturers. with sales totaling $US 700,000 in the store's first year of operation. The Changs later changed the name Fashion 21 to Forever 21 and changed the business model to fast fashion, drawing from trending fashion and selling the items for low prices. Sales were high enough in the first decade that the company added new stores on an average of every six months, largely in malls.

Forever 21 purchased the chain Gadzooks for $33 million in 2005, then doubled its number of stores to 400, over the next two years; retail analysts estimated sales growth from $640 million in 2005 to $1 billion in 2006. Unlike its competitors, the company also focused on whole families, rather than teenagers exclusively, and at a typical 25,000 square feet, had significantly larger stores. In 2006, the company opened its 40,000 square-foot showcase store in Pasadena, California, offering women's, men's, and children's clothing, as well as accessories and lingerie. Forever 21 was also operating a website and a number of free-standing For Love accessories stores. The company increased its square footage by 30% in 2007. In April 2008, the Chicago Tribune wrote that, while many retailers were scaling back expansion to adjust for the economy, Forever 21 was "going gangbusters" and expanding at a fast rate: over the prior three years its number of stores had doubled to around 400 worldwide.

In 2011, assets were $1.4 billion and profits were $124 million. That year the company was involved in a number of controversies. The Center for Environmental Health found that 26 retailers and suppliers, including Forever 21, had been selling jewelry containing cadmium, a toxic metal. That September, a settlement payment of $1.03 million and a 0.03% limit on cadmium in jewelry was the result. Also in 2011, several Forever 21 women's shirts were criticized by online users for seeming anti-education and sexist, including one that said "Allergic to Algebra", another that said "Skool sucks", and a third that had "I heart school" on the front and "not ..." on the back. Stating to ABC News that "our intent was not to discredit education," Forever 21 pulled the "Allergic to Algebra" shirt from its website. In April 2010, Rachel Kane, a writer and Forever 21 customer created a blog with the domain name WTForever21.com. Kane posted pictures of some Forever 21 items and voiced her opinions about the clothing. The blog's popularity rose after being featured on the Jezebel blog and, in June 2011, the retailer asked the blogger to take the site down or she might face a lawsuit. In September 2012, a lawyer filed a class action lawsuit against Forever 21 after receiving a penny less than original value during a return. According to media reports, to meet the $15,000 threshold in damages for the lawsuit to move forward, the case needed 750,000 other customers to sue as well. Forever 21 declined to comment on the matter, citing pending litigation.

By 2013, there were more than 480 stores and revenue of $3.7 billion. Between 2005 and 2015, international stores jumped from seven to 262. The family-owned company, which including the founders’ daughters, Linda Chang as executive vice president, and Esther Chang as vice president of merchandising, Forever 21's sales peaked in 2015, with $4.4 billion in global sales that year. Continuing to expand internationally, as of 2016, it had 31 locations in Brazil, although it had recently pulled out of Spain and Belgium. Forever 21 introduced the beauty chain Riley Rose in 2017, and later that year the company opened its 21st store in India. In 2017, revenue was $3.4 billion, a significant drop from the year prior.

=== 2018–2019: Competition and bankruptcy ===
Facing competition from other fast fashion brands, in 2018, it began downsizing its stores during what was dubbed a retail apocalypse. It left the Netherlands in January 2018, Thailand in June 2018, and Ireland in late 2018. Forever 21 then pulled out of Taiwan on March 31, 2019. In July 2019, the company was accused of fat shaming when they included weight-loss bars with orders containing plus-sized clothing. Forever 21 apologized, stating the bars were an "oversight."

The global explosion in fast fashion competitors, reputation damage (caused by both labor rights groups and environmentalists), high cost rental locations, and competition from online retail led to a temporary collapse in global operations. In 2019, the company experienced a 32% drop in global sales. Women's Wear Daily wrote about the bankruptcy, "the company over expanded with too many stores that were too big, and lacked sufficient e-commerce business." On September 29, 2019, Forever 21 filed for Chapter 11 bankruptcy protection. To downsize, the company announced that it was ceasing operations in 40 countries and closing a percentage of its 600 stores, particularly those in Asia and Europe, and to add focus to the profitable core part of its operations in the U.S. and Latin America, as well as on e-commerce and licensing agreements. Over the next year, it withdrew from Hong Kong, Portugal, Japan, and Canada, and closed its website and physical stores in England.

=== 2020–2025: SPARC ownership ===
By January 2020, the company had cut 350 of its 815 international stores under president Alex Ok. That month, Forever 21 relaunched its online store in 30 countries through the e-commerce company Global-e, targeting consumers in Canada, Asia Pacific, and Latin America. On February 2, 2020, it was announced that Forever 21 had reached a deal to sell all of its assets for $81 million to Simon Property Group, Brookfield Properties, and brand management firm Authentic Brands Group (ABG). ABG and Simon each acquired 37.5% of the company's intellectual property and operating businesses, while Brookfield acquired 25%. SPARC, a joint venture between Simon Property Group and Authentic Brands Group, took over Forever 21's management after the sale and appointed Daniel Kulle as Forever 21's new CEO. and immediately began expanding Forever 21 in Latin America via licensing deals. The company closed its stores through March 2020 in response to the COVID-19 pandemic. ABG appointed IB Group as Forever 21's licensee in Mexico in June 2020. That month, it also re-entered the UK and EU markets, opening online stores for British customers. In October it signed a licensing deal with AR Holdings to launch the brand in nine Latin American countries. Among other countries, in early 2020, it pulled out of Guam, South Africa and Lebanon.

In May 2021, Brookfield Property Partners sold its stake in Forever 21 for $63 million. After YM Inc. became the Canadian licensee for Forever 21 in June 2021, Hudson's Bay announced a partnership with Forever 21 in Canada. In August 2021, Forever 21 authorized Lasonic Limited Xusheng Co. Ltd. to manage its operations in China. Women's Wear Daily reported that Forever 21 had also "reentered major e-commerce platforms like Vip.com and Pinduoduo." It had 540 locations by December 2021 and, that month, partnered on product lines with JCPenney, which is also owned by Authentic Brands Group. In December 2021, Forever 21 announced that it had hired Virtual Brand Group to create a metaverse game for the company that allowed players to operate custom fashion stores. Winnie Park was appointed Forever 21's chief executive officer in January 2022. ABG sued Bolt Financial in New York for failure to "deliver promised technology", stating that Forever 21 had lost $150 million in online sales due to a botched rollout of a new e-commerce platform in 2021. ABG described Bolt's software integration with Forever 21's mobile app as "disastrous," with multiple technical issues interfering in purchases. Bolt argued the claims were meritless. In early 2022, Forever 21 collaborated with Hervé Léger, Sports Illustrated, and Barbie. That summer, the company opened a new flagship store in India licensed by Aditya Birla Fashion and Retail. In June 2022, Poetic Brands was granted licensee rights to manufacture, market, and distribute the brand in the United Kingdom and Europe.

In August 2023, Shein and SPARC Group entered into a joint venture where each company acquired a minority stake of the other; Shein acquired about a third of SPARC Group.

In February 2025, it was reported that Forever 21 was working with restructuring firm BRG to evaluate a range of possible options for the company including selling off profitable leases in order to stave off a second bankruptcy filing. Later that month, it was reported that Forever 21 would be closing 215 underperforming locations, with most stores to close by April. The company stated that these locations had not been making money for years.

On March 3, 2025, Forever 21 laid off 700 employees in California and Pennsylvania, and announced the closure of its headquarters in Los Angeles. The company also warned that it was preparing to file for Chapter 11 bankruptcy as soon as the following week after continuous struggles to find a buyer for its stores. On March 17, 2025, Forever 21, for the second time in nearly six years, filed for Chapter 11 bankruptcy protection in Delaware, listing liabilities between $1 billion and $5 billion, and assets between $100 million and $500 million, blaming decreasing mall traffic and competitors such as Temu and Shein as factors contributing to the filing. Forever 21 conducted liquidation sales at all of its US stores that same day, noting that it was unable to find a buyer, leading to the company's 350 remaining locations in the US being permanently closed. Its international operations, as well as its IP and trademark, are unaffected by the filing, the latter of which is currently owned by Authentic Brands Group. By May 1, 2025, Forever 21 permanently closed all of its US locations.

In September 2025, it was announced that Forever21 would relaunch as an online retailer. Unique Brands (who also own the now digital-only department store Bon-Ton) will run the US e-commerce platform and men's wholesale, Mark Edwards Apparel will run women's wholesale and Kidz Concepts will oversee children's wear. No American stores will open under the new plans.

== Employee relations and safety ==
In September 2001, the Asian Pacific American Legal Center and the Garment Worker Center, workers’ advocacy groups, filed a lawsuit against Forever 21, charging them of violating labor practice laws. They claimed that 19 contracted employees received less than the minimum wage, that the hours on time cards were reduced, that workers who complained to the state were fired, and that the employees faced sweatshop-like working conditions. Forever 21 denied the accusations, asserting its commitment to fair labor practices and that "none of the workers named in the suit were directly employed by the company". A three-year boycott of Forever 21 was held throughout the United States by the garment workers, with the 2007 documentary film, Made in L.A., capturing the movement. The charge was dismissed by U.S. District Court Judge Manuel Real, Forever 21 responded with a defamation suit in 2002, asserting that its reputation and sales were both impacted by the allegations and protests. In response, Kimi Lee, the director of an advocacy groups representing the workers, maintained that the lawsuits had been justified by complaints from 20 workers. Both cases ended in a settlement in December 2004.

Five Forever 21 employees filed a class-action lawsuit in January 2012, alleging that they had not been paid for bag checks and extra work during lunch breaks and the time spent on bag checks. After the Labor Department found that some of Forever 21's suppliers had violated various federal laws on wages and record-keeping, a subpoena was ordered in August 2012. U.S. District Court Judge Margaret Morrow ordered Forever 21's compliance after the retailer failed to provide the documents. The retailer claimed that it tried to meet with the Labor Department and that it had provided the requested information. In July 2014, the U.S. Department of Labor's Occupational Safety and Health Administration (OSHA) recommended fines in excess of $100,000 for three different retail locations in Northern New Jersey and Manhattan for "serious safety hazards" for which they had been cited since 2010.

== Licensing disputes ==
The company has faced a number of intellectual property lawsuits for its designs. In response, in 2007, Forever 21 described its design process as proprietary, noting it employed no designers, only "very savvy designer merchants" who were not disclosed, and that it worked with "many" suppliers and did not always know where those suppliers' ideas originated. Forever 21 is known for completely changing merchandise every six to eight weeks to account for new fashion trends. The New York Times noted in 2007 that "while it takes a designer like Marc Jacobs or Michael Kors several months to get clothes into stores after their debut on the runways, Forever 21 delivers interpretations of the same looks within six weeks." Critics such as Susan Scafidi, an expert in copyright law in 2011, question Forever 21's design process and argue that it is replicating the designs of others. CEO Chang said that some of their merchants had disappointed him after he had "overly trusted people" on their designs.

By October 2007, lawsuits numbered over 20, with Trovata, Anna Sui, Harajuku Lovers and Diane von Fürstenberg Studio all filing suits against Forever 21 that month. At the time, Von Furstenberg had been lobbying Congress to expand standing copyright statutes to protect clothing designs. However, The New York Times then noted that "[2007 American law] does not protect clothing design from being copied (logos are an exception)," opining the lawsuits would be unlikely to end in verdicts against Forever 21. In 2007, Forever 21 was "permanently enjoined from duplicating DVF designs". The Trovata case was the only instance where the case was brought to a jury. After a mistrial, where five jury members sided with Trovata and one with Forever 21, Forever 21 settled before it could go to retrial. in May 2009. As of 2011, Forever 21 had never been found guilty and the majority of cases had been resolved through settlements. In 2011, the company sent a cease-and-desist letter to the owner of WTForever21.com, a popular blog which posted humorous opinions of the company's products. The letter "incensed online communities and was reported internationally as an example of intimidation by big business".

On 8 January 2015, Canadian media reported on a local, family-owned business in Richmond, British Columbia, Granted Clothing, whose designer noticed that their sweater designs had been stolen and mass-produced for sale on Forever 21's website. In April 2015, both parties resolved the matter on "amicable terms", settling out of court. On 28 January 2015, the software developers Adobe, Autodesk and Corel filed a joint lawsuit against Forever 21 for allegedly using unlicensed copies of Photoshop, AutoCAD and PaintShop Pro, respectively. Asking for a jury trial, Forever 21 denied the allegations, accusing Adobe of bullying over online licensing fees, and asserting an "implied" license, as the software came bundled with other products. The case was settled in March 2016. In September 2019, American singer Ariana Grande accused and sued Forever 21 for $10 million for copying her style and likeness by dressing their models the same way in their photo-shoot from her music video of "7 Rings".

== Stores ==
The brand operated stores in multiple countries. As of May 2022, Forever 21 operated over 600 stores, including, as of July 2022, 407 U.S. stores in 43 states, with the highest densities in California, Texas, Florida, New York, Georgia, New Jersey, Pennsylvania, and Illinois. The original store in Los Angeles remained in operation until 2020, bearing the chain's original name. Outside of the United States, most of its stores are franchised or, in some markets, operated as joint ventures with local partners. The average store size was 38,000 square feet (3,500 m^{2}).
