= Emme =

Emme may refer to:

People:

- Ivan Fyodorovich Emme (1763–1839), Russian lieutenant general in the Napoleonic Wars
- Otto J. Emme, American politician and World War I veteran
- Emme Gerhard (1872–1946), American photographer
- Emme Rylan, American actress born Marcy Faith Behrens in 1980
- Emme (model), plus-size model born Melissa Miller in 1963
- Edna L. Emme, American hair care expert

Other uses:

- Emme (river), Canton of Berne, Switzerland
- Emme, versions of transportation forecasting software developed by INRO Software, later acquired by Bentley Systems

== See also ==
- Kleine Emme, a river in the Canton of Lucerne, Switzerland
- Emmen (disambiguation)
