= LRN =

LRN may refer to:

- Laboratory Response Network, a collaborative effort of the U.S. Centers for Disease Control and Prevention and the Association of Public Health Laboratories
- Land Rights News, the longest-running Aboriginal Australian newspaper, published by the Central and Northern Land Councils
- Lateral reticular nucleus, a nucleus of the medulla oblongata involved with co-ordinating baroreceptor signals to control arterial blood pressure
- Lead round nose, a type of bullet
- Legislative route number, a designation for a highway defined by laws passed in a state legislature
- Location Routing Number, a ten digit phone number used to route phone calls between two telephone exchanges
- LORAN, a terrestrial radio navigation system originally known as LRN for Loomis Radio Navigation
- LRN (company), an ethics compliance and education company
- Luminous red nova, a stellar explosion thought to be caused by the merger of two stars
