= Arnold & Porter =

American multinational law firm

Arnold & Porter Kaye Scholer LLP
- No. of offices: 16
- No. of attorneys: 1000+
- Major practice areas: General corporate practice, litigation, regulatory
- Date founded: 1946 (Arnold & Fortas); 1917 (Kaye Scholer)
- Company type: Limited liability partnership
- Website: arnoldporter.com

Arnold & Porter Kaye Scholer LLP, doing business as Arnold & Porter, is an American multinational law firm. It is a white-shoe firm and among the largest law firms in the world, both by revenue and by number of lawyers.

Arnold & Porter was founded in 1946 by Thurman Arnold and Abe Fortas, and was originally known as Arnold & Fortas. Paul Porter joined the firm a year later, becoming a name partner.

== History ==
The original firm was founded as Arnold & Fortas in 1946 by New Deal veterans Thurman Arnold, a former Yale Law School professor and U.S. Court of Appeals judge on the D.C. Circuit, and Abe Fortas, another former Yale Law School professor who later became a Supreme Court justice. In 1947, Paul A. Porter, a former chairman of the Federal Communications Commission, joined the firm and it was renamed as Arnold, Fortas & Porter. In 1965, Abe Fortas' name was dropped from the firm's name, after his ascension to the Supreme Court, as is customary. Arnold & Porter later refused to re-admit its founder to the firm, following Fortas' 1969 resignation from the Supreme Court.

Law360 named Arnold & Porter one of its litigation powerhouses in 2016, when more than half of the firm's lawyers worked in litigation and its disputes practice spanned nine offices.

In November 2016, Arnold & Porter announced a merger with New York-based firm Kaye Scholer, forming Arnold & Porter Kaye Scholer LLP, with approximately 1,000 attorneys across 14 offices. The merger took effect on January 1, 2017. In July 2025, the firm announced the launch of a new office in Seattle, bringing its tally of U.S.- based offices to 11.

In February 2018, The National Law Journal reported that the newly combined "firm has quietly reversed its post-merger branding efforts" and "scrubbed nearly all mention of Kaye Scholer from its public image, changing its brand name, email addresses and web domain", while retaining the legal entity name in full. In September 2020, Arnold & Porter announced that its Frankfurt office would be shut down by the end of March 2021.

In 2022, Arnold & Porter was a founding member of the Legal Alliance for Reproductive Rights, a coalition of United States law firms offering free legal services to people seeking and providing abortions in the wake of Dobbs v. Jackson Women's Health Organization, which overruled Roe v. Wade.

In 2024, Arnold & Porter reported a 5% increase in revenue, reaching $1.19 billion. Profits per equity partner rose to $1.63 million, and revenue per lawyer increased by 6.5% to $1.24 million.

== Notable clients and cases ==
In its earliest years, the firm took on the defense of federal employees accused of disloyalty under the personnel screening system established by the Truman administration, at times representing as many as 200 such clients a year, nearly all without charge. By 1949 roughly half of the hours the firm could otherwise have billed were going to such work. The partners declined to act for avowed members of the Communist Party, reasoning that the party would seek to dictate the conduct of the defense.

The first of these matters to draw wide attention concerned Dorothy Bailey, a mid-level supervisor at an agency that trained local employment officers. Summoned before a loyalty review board in 1948, she asked the firm to act for her; the board ruled against her, and she was dismissed in February 1949. Arnold and Porter argued the case themselves before the D.C. Court of Appeals, which ruled against Bailey 2–1, and in 1951 the Supreme Court divided 4–4, leaving the dismissal in place. The partners afterwards hired Bailey as the firm's office manager.

In 1950, after Senator Joseph McCarthy publicly described the Johns Hopkins China scholar Owen Lattimore as the leading Soviet agent in the United States, Fortas took on his defense. The accusations led to hearings before two Senate committees and to two perjury indictments brought by the Justice Department, which the government abandoned in 1955. The firm later put the cost of the case, conducted entirely without fee, at the equivalent of about $2.5 million in 2025 terms. The loyalty work did not damage the firm commercially, although one client, Sun Oil, is said to have left over its civil liberties activity.

In 1963, Abe Fortas of Arnold, Fortas & Porter, was appointed by the Supreme Court to represent Clarence Gideon in the landmark case of Gideon v. Wainwright. Abe Krash and John Hart Ely worked with Fortas on Gideon. This led to the Supreme Court upholding the right to counsel in felony prosecutions and requiring states to provide counsel to defendants unable to afford their own.

Writing in The New York Review of Books in 1972, the columnist Nicholas von Hoffman listed Coca-Cola, Lever Brothers, Western Union, the American Broadcasting Company, Greatamerica Corporation and Philip Morris among the firm's clients by that time.

Questions of the proper forum for suits over events abroad have recurred in the firm's transportation work. In Abeid-Saba v. Carnival Corp., it was lead counsel for Carnival and secured the dismissal by a Florida state appellate court of all claims brought by several hundred United States–based passengers of the Costa Concordia, which ran aground in 2012. Representing Airbus against relatives of those killed in the 2014 AirAsia crash, the firm obtained a dismissal on personal jurisdiction grounds and the first ruling by any United States court on that question under the Multiparty, Multiforum Trial Jurisdiction Act of 2002.

In Philip Morris Inc. v. Price, a dispute over the labeling of "light" cigarettes that ran for fifteen years, partner Lisa Blatt obtained the dismissal of a $10 billion verdict when the Illinois Supreme Court set it aside for a second time in November 2015, holding that the lower state courts had lacked authority to vacate its earlier judgment; the Supreme Court of the United States denied the plaintiffs' petition for review in June 2016, ending the case.

The firm has also represented Philip Morris in the personal injury claims brought by smokers after the class in Engle v. Liggett Group Inc. was decertified in 2006, where its appellate results included an affirmed award of no damages and the vacating of $17.4 million in punitive damages.

Acting as co-counsel on BP's legal team, the firm helped negotiate the consent decree under which BP Exploration & Production resolved Clean Water Act claims, natural resource damage claims and economic claims arising from the 2010 Deepwater Horizon oil spill with the Justice Department, five Gulf states and about 300 local government entities. Approved in April 2016, the resolution was estimated at $18.7 billion and was the largest the department had reached with a single entity. The firm also prevailed at trial for BP West Coast Products in the bellwether case for nine mass actions in which several hundred Atlantic Richfield service station franchisees sought more than $1 billion, the jury rejecting claims that wholesale gasoline prices had been set in bad faith and on commercially unreasonable terms.

The firm has represented General Electric in its $32 billion merger of GE Oil & Gas with Baker Hughes; AT&T in its $49 billion purchase of DIRECTV; and Pfizer in its $43 billion acquisition of Seagen.

In its product liability practice, the firm has represented Bristol Myers Squibb and Sanofi in litigation over the blood thinner Plavix, arguing before the Supreme Court of California against the consolidation of plaintiffs from across the country in favorable jurisdictions, and has defended Bristol-Myers in claims concerning the drug Abilify. Its antitrust group overturned a $156 million jury verdict against Nucor Corporation in MM Steel LP v. Reliance Steel & Aluminum Co. before the Fifth Circuit. The firm has also acted for the Federal Housing Finance Agency, the conservator of Fannie Mae and Freddie Mac, in shareholder litigation over the terms of the companies' bailout.

Arnold & Porter represented OxyContin manufacturer Purdue Pharma in opioid epidemic litigation during the late 2010s.

Firm partner Axel Gutermuth represented AbbVie in its $63 billion purchase of Allergan.

In 2022, the firm was sanctioned and fined $150,000 by a Suffolk County, New York, court for discovery disclosure breaches in its representation of Endo Pharmaceuticals in opioid litigation.

== Pro bono cases ==
In 2020, Arnold & Porter attorneys helped secure a $14 million judgment for 12 Black Lives Matter protesters who were victims of police brutality in Colorado. The matter took 18 months to settle and required 14,000-plus lawyer hours.

Attorneys with the firm assisted the family of Lt. Henry Ossian Flipper in obtaining the first posthumous presidential pardon in U.S. history, and represented Ukrainian mail order bride Nataliya Fox against international marriage broker Encounters International in a landmark case that helped to establish the rights of such women.

The firm is co-counsel with the DC Prisoners' Project of the Washington Lawyers' Committee for Civil Rights and Urban Affairs, which represents prisoners at ADX Florence who allege deficiencies in psychiatric evaluation and care in Cunningham v. Federal Bureau of Prisons.

In 2020 the firm joined the American Civil Liberties Union of the District of Columbia, the Washington Lawyers' Committee for Civil Rights and Urban Affairs and the Lawyers' Committee for Civil Rights Under Law in filing Black Lives Matter D.C. v. Barr, a class action brought on behalf of Black Lives Matter D.C. and eight demonstrators affected by the clearing of Lafayette Square on June 1, 2020. In June 2021 Judge Dabney Friedrich dismissed the claims against William Barr and other federal officials, finding no sufficient evidence of an agreement to violate the protesters' rights and holding that the officials were immune from civil suit, while allowing claims against the Metropolitan and Arlington police departments to proceed. In April 2022, under a partial settlement of a separate portion of the case, the federal government agreed to revise United States Park Police and Secret Service policies governing demonstrations; the remaining claims, brought under District of Columbia law, were dismissed in July 2024.

In 2023 the firm won Health and Hospital Corporation of Marion County v. Talevski before the Supreme Court, a decision confirming that Medicaid recipients may seek redress when denied proper care.

== Offices ==
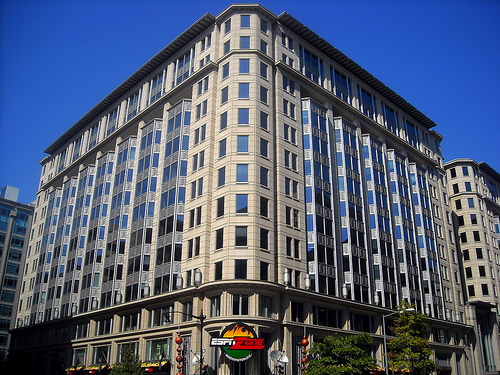
Thurman Arnold Building is the former location of Arnold & Porter's offices in Washington, D.C. The firm relocated to 601 Mass. Ave NW in 2015.

- Amsterdam, the Netherlands
- (United States) Boston, Massachusetts
- Brussels, Belgium
- (United States) Chicago, Illinois
- (United States) Denver, Colorado
- London, United Kingdom
- (United States) Los Angeles, California
- (United States) Houston, Texas
- (United States) Newark, New Jersey
- (United States) New York, New York
- (United States) Palo Alto, California
- (United States) San Francisco, California
- (United States) Seattle, Washington
- Seoul, South Korea
- Shanghai, China
- (United States) Washington, D.C.

== Notable people ==
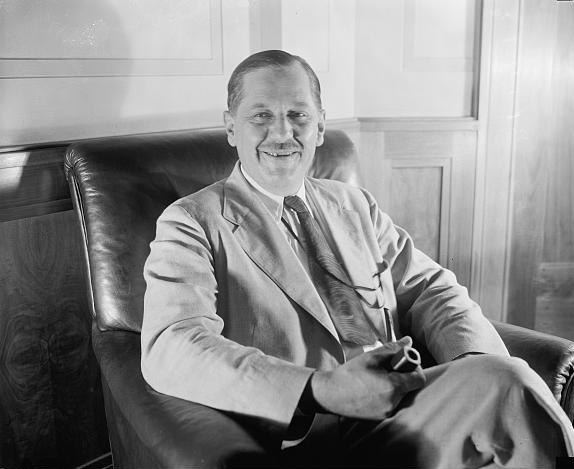
Thurman Arnold

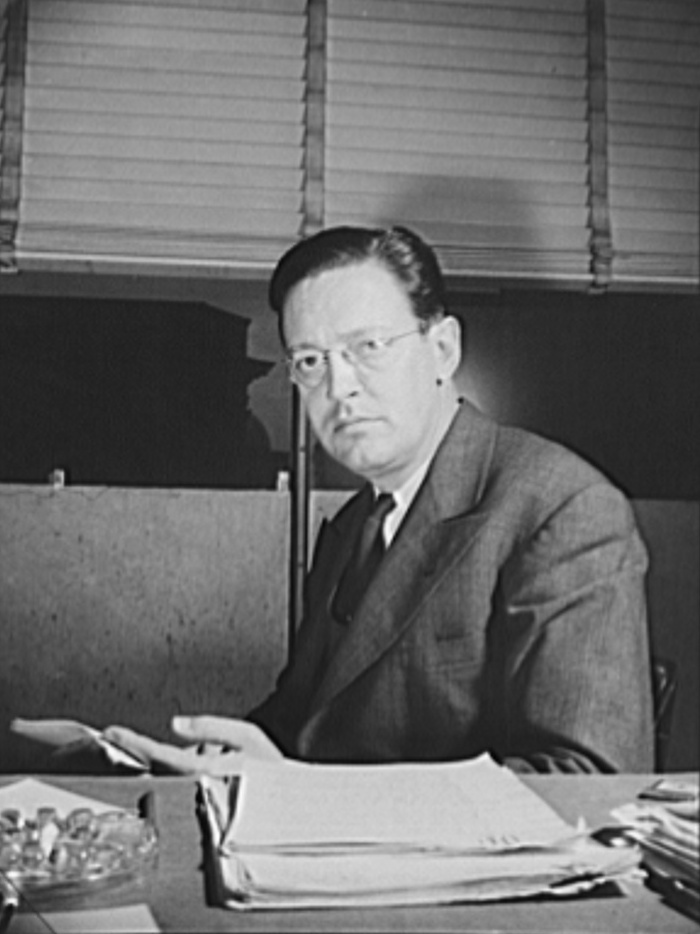
Paul Porter

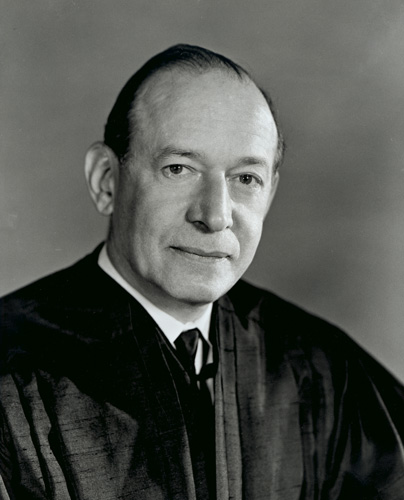
Abe Fortas

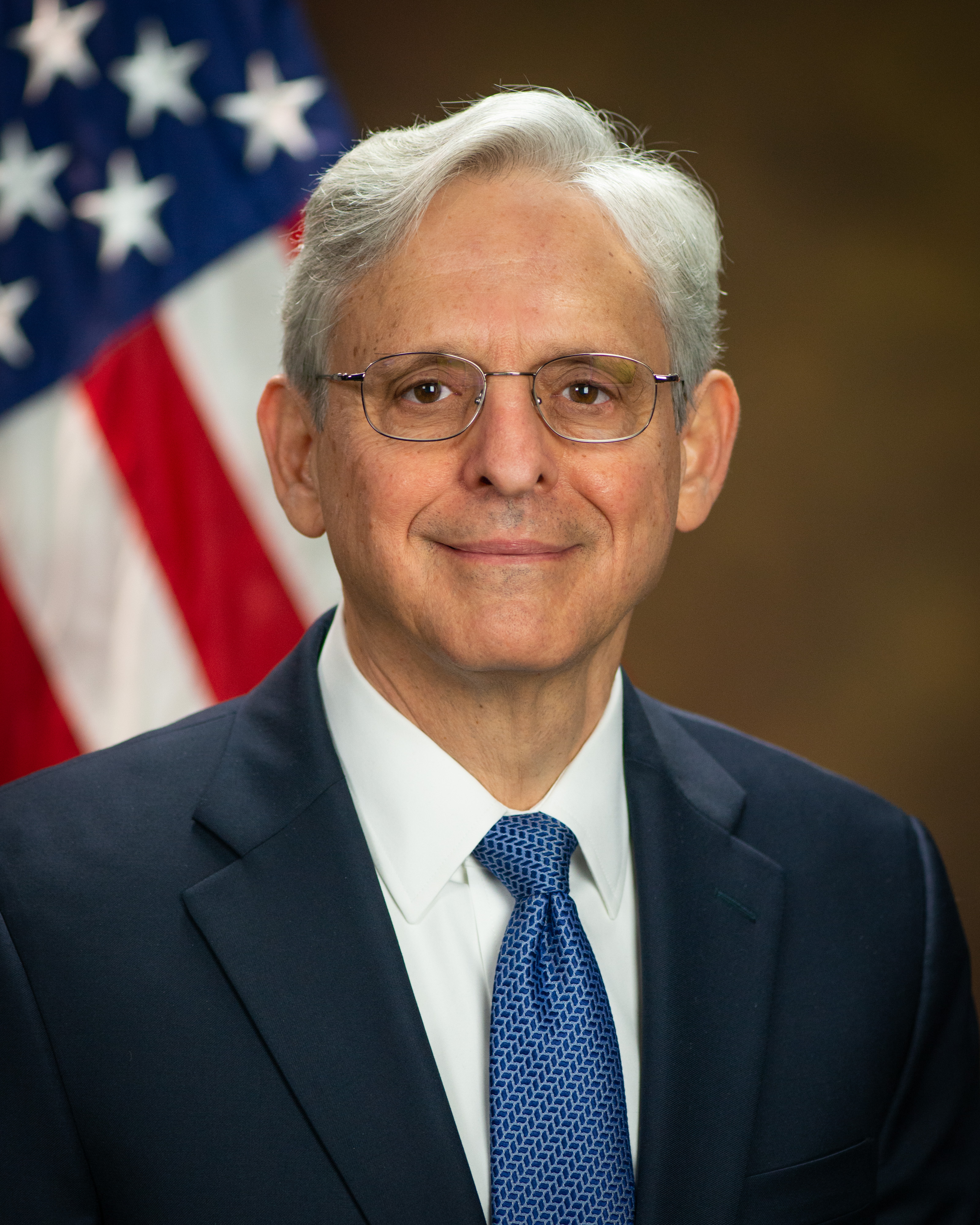
Merrick Garland

- Clifford Alexander - U.S. Secretary of the Army, chairman of the Equal Employment Opportunity Commission, and presidential advisor
- Thurman Arnold, founder — U.S. Court of Appeals Judge for the D.C. Circuit, Yale Law School Professor
- William Baer — United States Department of Justice Assistant Attorney General, Antitrust Division
- Naomi Biden — lawyer and granddaughter of U.S. President Joe Biden
- David Bonderman (born 1942) — businessman
- Brooksley Born — Chairwoman, U.S. Commodity Futures Trading Commission
- Joseph A. Califano — U.S. Secretary of Health, Education, and Welfare, Chairman of the National Center of Addiction and Substance Abuse
- Pamela Ki Mai Chen — United States District Judge of the United States District Court for the Eastern District of New York
- Eli Whitney Debevoise II — U.S. Executive Director of the World Bank
- Mary DeRosa — former Deputy Counsel to the President for National Security Affairs in the Obama administration
- Chris Dodd — former Democratic Senator, Connecticut
- Allison H. Eid — Judge of the United States Court of Appeals for the Tenth Circuit
- John Hart Ely — legal scholar and former dean of Stanford Law School
- Abe Fortas, founder — Supreme Court Justice, Yale Law School professor
- Merrick Garland — former Attorney General of the United States, former U.S. Court of Appeals Chief Judge for the D.C. Circuit, 2016 nominee to the Supreme Court to replace Antonin Scalia
- Sherilyn Peace Garnett — Judge of the United States District Court for the Central District of California
- Michael Gerrard — Columbia Law School professor, former partner in charge of the firm's New York City office
- Charles Halpern — Founder of the Center for Law and Social Policy, first Dean of City University of New York School of Law, Berkeley School of Law professor
- Kenneth I. Juster — Under Secretary of Commerce for Export Administration
- Timothy J. Kelly — Judge of the United States District Court for the District of Columbia
- Abe Krash – partner, legal scholar, contributor to Gideon v. Wainwright (1963), Georgetown Law professor
- David Lammy - U.K. Foreign Secretary worked for Howard Rice which was acquired by Arnold & Porter
- Irvin B. Nathan — Attorney General of the District of Columbia, General Counsel of the United States House of Representatives
- Matthew G. Olsen — Director of the National Counterterrorism Center and former General Counsel of the National Security Agency
- Paul A. Porter, founder — Chairman of the Federal Communications Commission
- Margaret M. Morrow — United States District Judge of the United States District Court for the Central District of California
- Jack Quinn — former Clinton White House counsel and founder of Quinn Gillespie & Associates
- Sarah Bloom Raskin — member of the Board of Governors of the Federal Reserve System
- Charles A. Reich — legal and social scholar
- William D. Rogers — President, American Society of International Law, Undersecretary of State for Economic Affairs, Assistant Secretary of State for Inter-American Affairs
- Jonathan Schiller — co-founder and managing partner, Boies Schiller Flexner LLP
- Dov Seidman — author, columnist and businessman
