= Sherilyn Peace Garnett =

American judge (born 1969)

Sherilyn Garnett
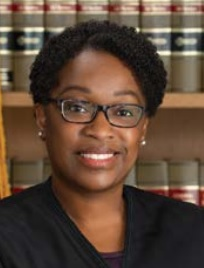

Judge of the United States District Court for the Central District of California
- Incumbent
- Assumed office June 24, 2022
- Appointed by: Joe Biden
- Preceded by: Manuel Real

Judge of the Los Angeles County Superior Court
- In office 2014 – June 24, 2022
- Appointed by: Jerry Brown
- Succeeded by: Richard Bloom

Personal details
- Born: Sherilyn Rosa Lee Peace; 1969 (age 56–57) Grand Cayman, Cayman Islands
- Party: Democratic
- Education: University of California, Riverside (BA); Harvard University (JD)

Sherilyn Peace Garnett (née Peace; born 1969) is an American attorney who serves as a United States district judge of the United States District Court for the Central District of California. She served as a judge of the Los Angeles County Superior Court from 2014 to 2022.

== Early life and education ==
Garnett was born on Grand Cayman. She received a Bachelor of Arts, with honors, from the University of California, Riverside, in 1991 and a Juris Doctor from Harvard Law School in 1995.

== Career ==
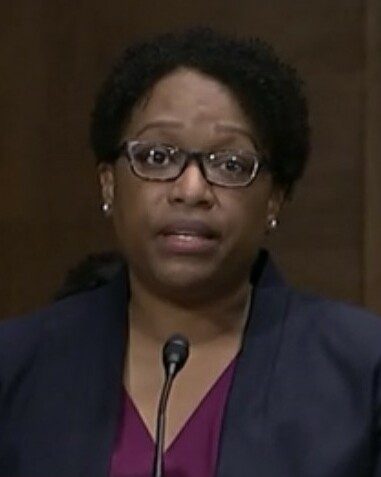
Garnett during her hearing with the Senate Judiciary Committee

Garnett began her career as a litigation associate at Altheimer & Gray in Chicago from 1995 to 1998. She then served as a law clerk for Judge Barry Ted Moskowitz of the United States District Court for the Southern District of California from 1998 to 1999. From 1999 to 2000, Garnett was a litigation associate at Arnold & Porter in Los Angeles. From 2001 to 2014, she served as an Assistant United States attorney for the Central District of California in the Criminal Division. She served as chief of the general crimes section in 2014, deputy chief of the general crimes section from 2011 to 2014, and as the domestic terrorism coordinator for the Central District of California from 2008 to 2011. From 2014 to 2022, she served as a judge of the Los Angeles County Superior Court after being appointed by Governor Jerry Brown.

=== Federal judicial service ===
On December 15, 2021, President Joe Biden nominated Garnett to serve as a United States district judge of the United States District Court for the Central District of California. President Biden nominated Garnett to the seat vacated by Judge Manuel Real, who assumed senior status on November 4, 2018. On February 16, 2022, a hearing on her nomination was held before the Senate Judiciary Committee. On March 10, 2022, her nomination was reported out of committee by a 17–5 vote. On April 27, 2022, the United States Senate invoked cloture on her nomination by a 64–34 vote. She was confirmed later that day by a 62–33 vote. She received her judicial commission on June 24, 2022.

== See also ==
- List of African American federal judges
- List of African American jurists

Legal offices
Preceded by Manuel Real	Judge of the United States District Court for the Central District of California; 2022–present	Incumbent
