= Emen =

Emen may refer to:

- Emen, Bulgaria, a village in Bulgaria
- Emen, Bor, a village in Turkey
- Emen Island, an island in Antarctica

== See also ==
- Emmen (disambiguation)
