= William P. James =

American federal judge (1870–1940)

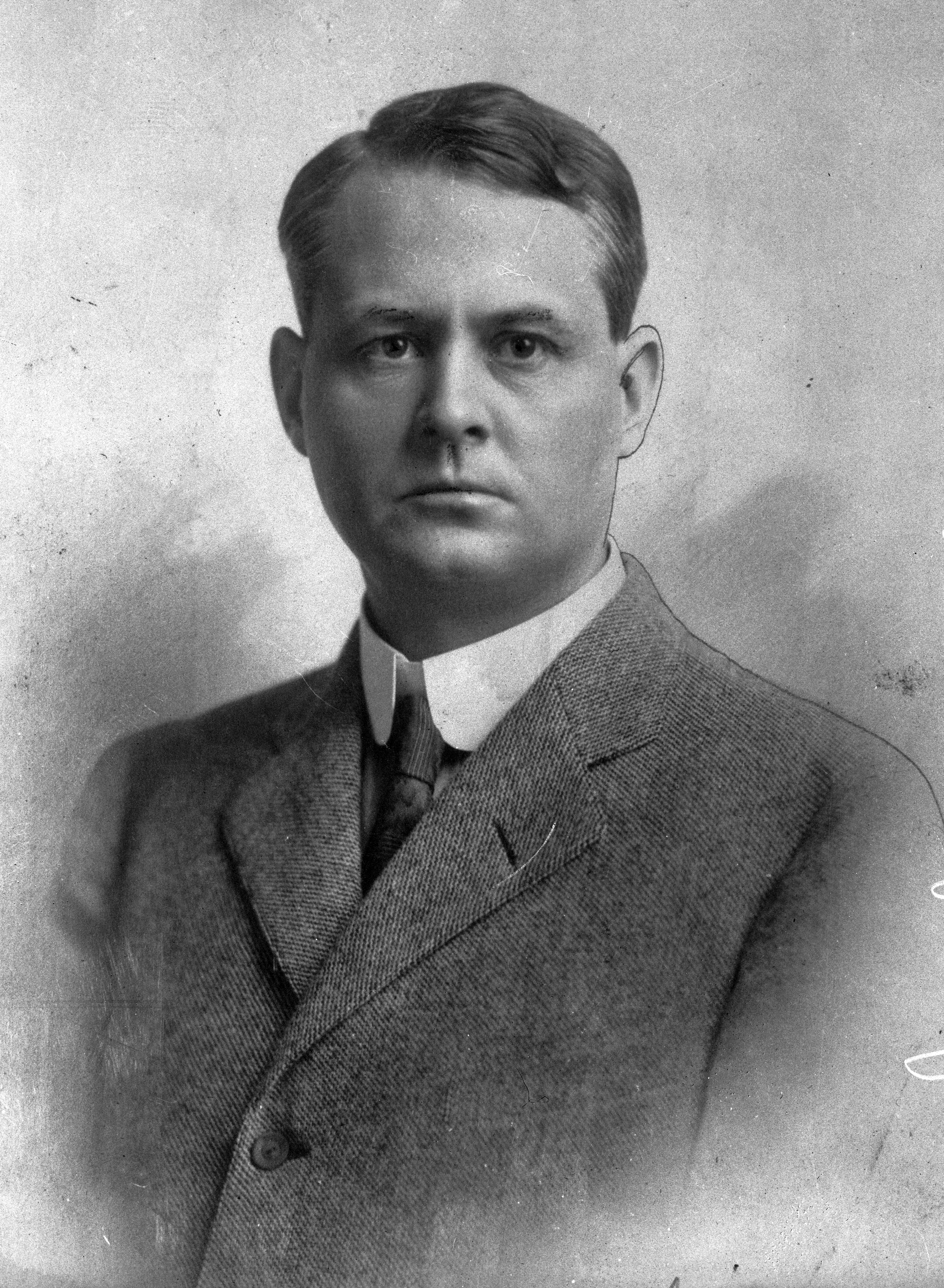

Judge of the United States District Court for the Southern District of California
- In office March 3, 1923 – July 28, 1940
- Appointed by: Warren G. Harding
- Preceded by: Seat established by 42 Stat. 837
- Succeeded by: James F. T. O'Connor

Personal details
- Born: January 10, 1870; Buffalo, New York
- Died: July 28, 1940 (aged 70); Santa Monica, California

William P. James (January 10, 1870 – July 28, 1940) was a United States district judge of the United States District Court for the Southern District of California.

== Education and career ==
Born in Buffalo, New York, James began his career in private practice in Los Angeles, California. He was a Judge of the Los Angeles County Superior Court from 1905 to 1910, and of the California Court of Appeals from 1910 to 1923.

== Federal judicial service ==
On March 2, 1923, James was nominated by President Warren G. Harding to a new seat on the United States District Court for the Southern District of California created by 42 Stat. 837. He was confirmed by the United States Senate on March 3, 1923, and received his commission the same day. James served in that capacity until his death on July 28, 1940, at Santa Monica Hospital from injuries he suffered in an auto accident. In 1932 when Oliver Wendell Holmes Jr. retired from the Supreme Court, James was on President Herbert Hoover’s list of possible replacements, although the seat ultimately went to Benjamin N. Cardozo.

== Sources ==
Legal offices
Preceded by Seat established by 42 Stat. 837	Judge of the United States District Court for the Southern District of California; 1923–1940	Succeeded by James Francis Thaddeus O'Connor
