= A. Andrew Hauk =

American judge

Senior Judge of the United States District Court for the Central District of California
- In office September 29, 1982 – November 9, 2004

Chief Judge of the United States District Court for the Central District of California
- In office 1980–1982
- Preceded by: Irving Hill
- Succeeded by: Manuel Real

Judge of the United States District Court for the Central District of California
- In office September 18, 1966 – September 29, 1982
- Appointed by: operation of law
- Preceded by: Seat established by 80 Stat. 75
- Succeeded by: Harry Lindley Hupp

Judge of the United States District Court for the Southern District of California
- In office June 29, 1966 – September 18, 1966
- Appointed by: Lyndon B. Johnson
- Preceded by: William Matthew Byrne Sr.
- Succeeded by: Seat abolished

Personal details
- Born: Aloysius Andrew Hauk; December 29, 1912 Denver, Colorado, U.S.
- Died: November 9, 2004 (aged 91) Pasadena, California, U.S.
- Education: Regis University (A.B.); Columbus School of Law (LL.B.); Yale Law School (J.S.D.)

Aloysius Andrew Hauk (December 29, 1912 – November 9, 2004) was a United States district judge of the United States District Court for the Central District of California.

== Education and career ==
Born in Denver, Colorado, Hauk received an Artium Baccalaureus degree from Regis College, later renamed Regis University, in 1935, a Bachelor of Laws from Columbus School of Law at Catholic University of America in 1938, and a Doctor of Juridical Science from Yale Law School in 1942. He was a special assistant to the United States Attorney General's Office for the Antitrust Division from 1939 to 1941. He was an Assistant United States Attorney for the Southern District of California from 1941 to 1942. He was a Lieutenant in the United States Naval Reserve working in Naval Intelligence during World War II, from 1942 to 1946. He was in private practice in Los Angeles, California from 1946 to 1964, which included work as assistant counsel to Union Oil Company in Los Angeles from 1952 to 1964. He was a judge of the Superior Court of Los Angeles County from 1964 to 1966.

== Federal judicial service ==
On June 13, 1966, Hauk was nominated by President Lyndon B. Johnson to a seat on the United States District Court for the Southern District of California vacated by Judge William Matthew Byrne Sr. Hauk was confirmed by the United States Senate on June 29, 1966, and received his commission the same day. On September 18, 1966, Hauk was reassigned by operation of law to the newly created United States District Court for the Central District of California, to a new seat established by 80 Stat. 75. Hauk served as Chief Judge from 1980 to 1982 and assumed senior status on September 29, 1982. He served in that capacity until his death on November 9, 2004, in Pasadena, California.

== Sources ==
Legal offices
Preceded by William Matthew Byrne Sr.	Judge of the United States District Court for the Southern District of California; 1966	Succeeded by Seat abolished
Preceded by Seat established by 80 Stat. 75	Judge of the United States District Court for the Central District of California; 1966–1982	Succeeded by Harry Lindley Hupp
Preceded by Irving Hill	Chief Judge of the United States District Court for the Central District of California; 1980–1982	Succeeded by Manuel Real
