= Cunningham v. Federal Bureau of Prisons =

Cunningham v. Federal Bureau of Prisons was a federal class-action lawsuit against the Federal Bureau of Prisons and officials who run ADX Florence, a supermax prison in Fremont County, Colorado. In 2012, 11 inmates filed the suit, originally named Bacote v. Federal Bureau of Prisons. The suit alleged chronic abuse, failure to properly diagnose, and neglect of prisoners who are seriously mentally ill.

The prisoners were represented by the firm Arnold & Porter and the DC Prisoners' Project of the Washington Lawyers' Committee for Civil Rights and Urban Affairs.

ADX Florence was not legally permitted to hold prisoners who were mentally ill. Prisoners at the supermax facility had filed 14 lawsuits prior to Cunningham. The class-action suit progressed through pretrial discovery. Discussions between the parties led to a settlement that included additional mental health screenings by medical professionals and a lifting of the ban on psychotropic medicine in the Control Unit of the prison. As part of the settlement, Federal Bureau of Prisons officials agreed to changes in their mental health treatment protocols at ADX Florence. Federal officials also agreed to improved training of personnel on recognizing and responding to mental illness.

United States District Court for the District of Colorado judge Richard Paul Matsch approved the settlement in December 2016. Due to the lawsuit, over 100 prisoners who had been diagnosed with mental illnesses were transferred to other facilities.
