= James Francis Thaddeus O'Connor =

American judge (1886–1949)

James O'Connor
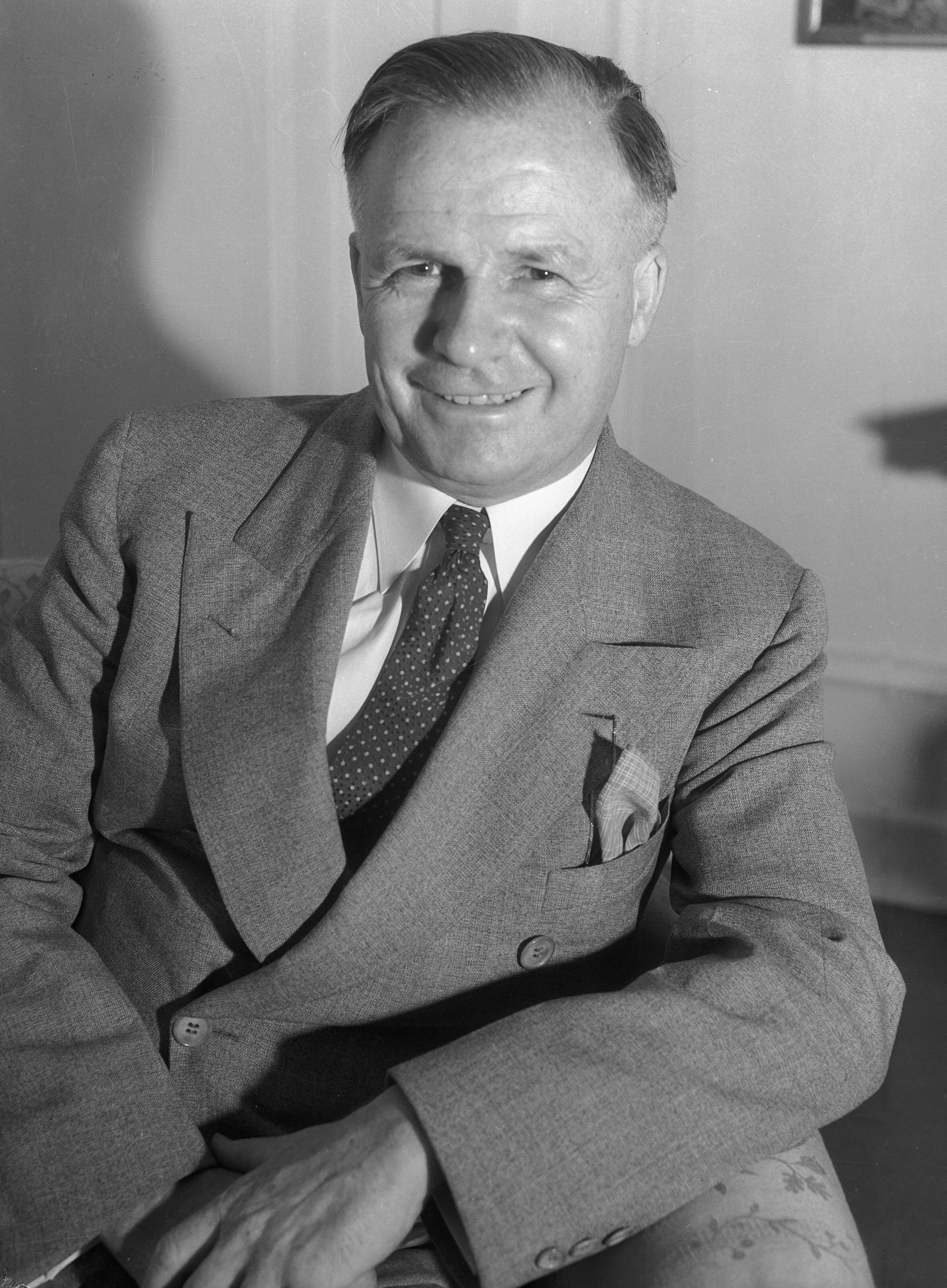
- O'Connor c. 1930s

Judge of the United States District Court for the Southern District of California
- In office September 27, 1940 – September 28, 1949
- Appointed by: Franklin D. Roosevelt
- Preceded by: William P. James
- Succeeded by: William Matthew Byrne Sr.

18th Comptroller of the Currency
- In office May 11, 1933 – April 16, 1938
- President: Franklin D. Roosevelt
- Preceded by: John W. Pole
- Succeeded by: Preston Delano

Member of the North Dakota House of Representatives from the Grand Forks district
- In office 1917–1920

Personal details
- Born: James Francis Thaddeus O'Connor; November 10, 1886 Grand Forks, Dakota Territory, U.S. (now North Dakota)
- Died: September 28, 1949 (aged 62) Los Angeles, California, U.S.
- Party: Democratic
- Education: University of North Dakota (BA, LLB); Yale University (LLB, MA)

James Francis Thaddeus “Jefty” O'Connor (November 10, 1886 – September 28, 1949) was a United States district judge of the United States District Court for the Southern District of California.

== Education and career ==
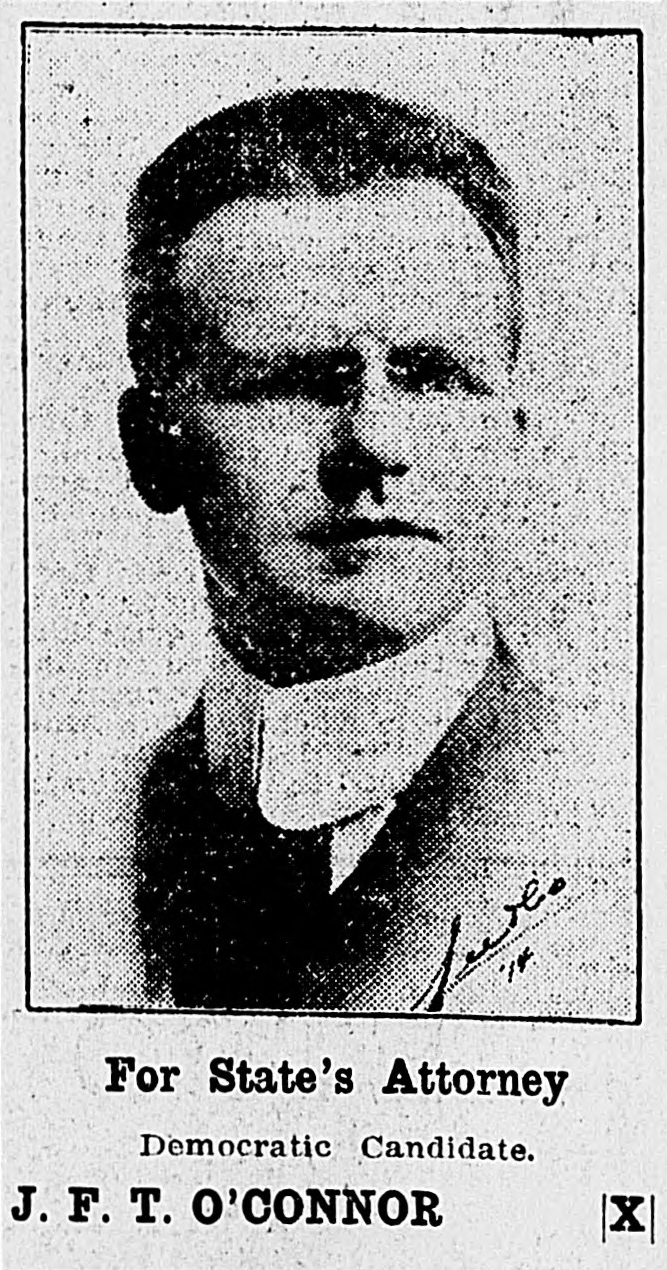
O'Connor as a candidate for state's attorney, 1914

Born in Grand Forks, Dakota Territory (now North Dakota), O'Connor received an Artium Baccalaureus degree from the University of North Dakota in 1907, a Bachelor of Laws from the University of North Dakota School of Law in 1908, a Bachelor of Laws from Yale Law School in 1909, and a Master of Arts degree from Yale University in 1910. He was an Instructor of Rhetoric at Yale University from 1909 to 1912. He was in private practice in Grand Forks from 1912 to 1925, and in Los Angeles, California from 1925 to 1933. He served as Comptroller of the Currency in the United States Department of the Treasury from May 11, 1933 to April 16, 1938.

O'Connor also served in the North Dakota Legislature. He served in the North Dakota House of Representatives from 1917 to 1920. During this time, he was an opponent of the Nonpartisan League and was associated with the Independent Voters Association. He unsuccessfully ran for governor in 1920 and for senator in 1922, losing both elections to Lynn Frazier.

== Federal judicial service ==
O'Connor was nominated by President Franklin D. Roosevelt on August 28, 1940, to a seat on the United States District Court for the Southern District of California vacated by Judge William P. James. He was confirmed by the United States Senate on September 19, 1940, and received his commission on September 27, 1940. He served until his death in Los Angeles on September 28, 1949.

== See also ==
- 1920 North Dakota gubernatorial election
- 1922 United States Senate election in North Dakota

Party political offices
Preceded by S. J. Doyle	Democratic nominee for Governor of North Dakota; 1920	Vacant Title next held by Halvor L. Halvorson; 1924
Preceded by John Burke	Democratic nominee for U.S. Senator from North Dakota (Class 1); 1922	Succeeded by F. F. Burchard
Legal offices
Preceded by William P. James	Judge of the United States District Court for the Southern District of California; 1940–1949	Succeeded by William Matthew Byrne Sr.
