= Irving Hill =

American judge (1915–1998)

Senior Judge of the United States District Court for the Central District of California
- In office October 15, 1980 – March 18, 1998

Chief Judge of the United States District Court for the Central District of California
- In office 1979–1980
- Preceded by: Albert Lee Stephens Jr.
- Succeeded by: A. Andrew Hauk

Judge of the United States District Court for the Central District of California
- In office September 18, 1966 – October 15, 1980
- Appointed by: operation of law
- Preceded by: Seat established by 80 Stat. 75
- Succeeded by: Richard Arthur Gadbois Jr.

Judge of the United States District Court for the Southern District of California
- In office June 10, 1965 – September 18, 1966
- Appointed by: Lyndon B. Johnson
- Preceded by: William Carey Mathes
- Succeeded by: Seat abolished

Personal details
- Born: Irving Hill; February 6, 1915 Lincoln, Nebraska, U.S.
- Died: March 18, 1998 (aged 83) Los Angeles, California, U.S.
- Education: University of Nebraska (B.A.); Harvard Law School (LL.B.)

Irving Hill (February 6, 1915 – March 18, 1998) was a United States district judge of the United States District Court for the Central District of California.

== Education and career ==
Born in Lincoln, Nebraska, Hill received a Bachelor of Arts degree from the University of Nebraska in 1936 and a Bachelor of Laws from Harvard Law School in 1939. He was an attorney for the United States Department of Justice in Washington, D.C. in 1939. He was an assistant to the general counsel of the Bonneville Power Administration in Portland, Oregon from 1939 to 1942. He was a Special Assistant United States Attorney of the United States Department of Justice in Washington, D.C. from 1942 to 1946. He was a United States Naval Reserve Lieutenant, J.G., towards the end of World War II, from 1944 to 1946. He was than a legal adviser to the United States delegation to the United Nations Economic and Social Council in 1946, and was in private practice in Beverly Hills, California from 1946 to 1961. He was a judge of the Los Angeles Superior Court from 1961 to 1965.

== Federal judicial service ==
On May 18, 1965, Hill was nominated by President Lyndon B. Johnson to a seat on the United States District Court for the Southern District of California vacated by Judge William Carey Mathes. Hill was confirmed by the United States Senate on June 9, 1965, and received his commission on June 10, 1965. On September 18, 1966, Hill was reassigned by operation of law to the United States District Court for the Central District of California, to a new seat established by 80 Stat. 75. He served as Chief Judge of that court from 1979 to 1980. He assumed senior status on October 15, 1980, and served in that capacity until his death, on March 18, 1998, in Los Angeles.

== See also ==
- List of Jewish American jurists

== Sources ==
Legal offices
Preceded by William Carey Mathes	Judge of the United States District Court for the Southern District of California; 1965–1966	Succeeded by Seat abolished
Preceded by Seat established by 80 Stat. 75	Judge of the United States District Court for the Central District of California; 1966–1980	Succeeded by Richard Arthur Gadbois Jr.
Preceded by Albert Lee Stephens Jr.	Chief Judge of the United States District Court for the Central District of California; 1979–1980	Succeeded by A. Andrew Hauk
