= Hernán D. Vera =

American judge (born 1970)

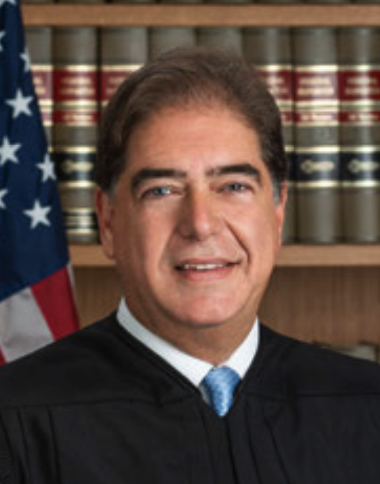

Judge of the United States District Court for the Central District of California
- Incumbent
- Assumed office June 15, 2023
- Appointed by: Joe Biden
- Preceded by: Margaret M. Morrow

Judge of the Los Angeles County Superior Court
- In office November 13, 2020 – June 15, 2023
- Appointed by: Gavin Newsom
- Preceded by: Elizabeth R. Feffer
- Succeeded by: Paris G. Lewis

Member of the Board of Directors of the State Justice Institute
- In office June 2010 – June 2023
- President: Barack Obama; Donald Trump; Joe Biden
- Preceded by: Terrence B. Adamson
- Succeeded by: vacant

Personal details
- Born: Hernán Diego Vera; 1970 (age 55–56) Escondido, California, U.S.
- Party: Democratic
- Education: Stanford University (BA); University of California, Los Angeles (JD)

Hernán Diego Vera (born 1970) is an American judge from California who is serving as a United States district judge of the United States District Court for the Central District of California. He previously served as a judge of the Los Angeles County Superior Court from 2020 to 2023.

== Early life and education ==
Vera was born in 1970 in Escondido, California. He received his Bachelor of Arts, with distinction, from Stanford University in 1991 and his Juris Doctor from the UCLA School of Law in 1994.

== Career ==
Vera served as a law clerk for Judge Consuelo Bland Marshall of the United States District Court for the Central District of California from 1995 to 1996. He worked as a staff attorney for the Mexican American Legal Defense and Educational Fund from 1996 to 1997. From 1994 to 1995 and again from 1997 to 2002, Vera worked as an associate and counsel at O'Melveny & Myers. From 2002 to 2014, he worked for Public Counsel, the largest pro bono public interest law firm in the nation, first as a directing attorney and later as president and CEO. Later, from 2015 to 2020 he was a principal at Bird Marella P.C. On November 13, 2020, California Governor Gavin Newsom appointed Vera to be a Judge of the Los Angeles County Superior Court to fill the vacancy left by the retirement of Judge Elizabeth R. Feffer. He left in 2023 to become a federal judge.

=== Federal judicial service ===
On September 8, 2021, President Joe Biden announced his intent to nominate Vera to serve as a United States district judge of the United States District Court for the Central District of California. On September 20, 2021, his nomination was sent to the Senate. President Biden nominated Vera to the seat vacated by Judge Margaret M. Morrow, who assumed senior status on October 29, 2015. On October 20, 2021, a hearing on his nomination was held before the Senate Judiciary Committee. On December 2, 2021, the committee failed to report his nomination by an 11–11 vote. On January 3, 2022, his nomination was returned to the President under Rule XXXI, Paragraph 6 of the United States Senate; he was renominated the same day. On January 20, 2022, the committee again failed to report his nomination by an 11–11 vote. On June 22, 2022, the Senate discharged the committee from further consideration of his nomination by a 50–47 vote. On January 3, 2023, his nomination was returned to the President under Rule XXXI, Paragraph 6 of the Senate; he was renominated later the same day. On February 9, 2023, his nomination was reported out of committee by an 11–10 vote. On June 13, 2023, the Senate invoked cloture on his nomination by a 51–48 vote. Later that same day, his nomination was confirmed by a 51–48 vote. He received his judicial commission on June 15, 2023.

== See also ==
- List of Hispanic and Latino American jurists

Legal offices
Preceded by Margaret M. Morrow	Judge of the United States District Court for the Central District of California; 2023–present	Incumbent
