= Richard Arthur Gadbois Jr. =

American judge (1932–1996)

Senior Judge of the United States District Court for the Central District of California
- In office January 24, 1996 – October 2, 1996

Judge of the United States District Court for the Central District of California
- In office July 28, 1982 – January 24, 1996
- Appointed by: Ronald Reagan
- Preceded by: Irving Hill
- Succeeded by: Margaret M. Morrow

Personal details
- Born: Richard Arthur Gadbois Jr. June 18, 1932 Omaha, Nebraska, U.S.
- Died: October 2, 1996 (aged 64) Los Angeles, California, U.S.
- Education: St. John's University (A.B.); Loyola Law School (J.D.)

Richard Arthur Gadbois Jr. (June 18, 1932 – October 2, 1996) was a United States district judge of the United States District Court for the Central District of California.

== Education and career ==
Born in Omaha, Nebraska, Gadbois received an Artium Baccalaureus from St. John's University in 1955 and a Juris Doctor from Loyola Law School in Los Angeles, California in 1958. He attended the University of Southern California Law School in 1960. He was a deputy state attorney general of California from 1958 to 1959. He was in private practice in Los Angeles from 1960 to 1968. He was a vice president, general counsel and secretary of Denny's, Inc., in La Mirada, California from 1968 to 1971. He was a Judge of the Municipal Court of California, City of Los Angeles from 1971 to 1972, and on the Superior Court of California, County of Los Angeles from 1972 to 1982.

== Federal judicial service ==
On June 28, 1982, Gadbois was nominated by President Ronald Reagan to a seat on the United States District Court for the Central District of California vacated by Judge Irving Hill. Gadbois was confirmed by the United States Senate on July 27, 1982, and received his commission on July 28, 1982. He assumed senior status on January 24, 1996 due to a certified disability, and served in that capacity until his death later that year in Los Angeles.

== Sources ==
Legal offices
| Preceded by Irving Hill | Judge of the United States District Court for the Central District of California; 1982–1996 | Succeeded by Margaret M. Morrow |
