= Do Won and Jin Sook Chang =

South Korean-American businessman

Do Won Chang
- Born: March 20, 1954 (age 71); South Korea
- Occupations: Founder and former owner of Forever 21
- Years active: 1984–2020
- Employer: Forever 21 (1984–2020) (bankrupt)
- Spouse: Jin Sook Chang (m.?)
- Children: 2 daughters

Do Won Chang (Hangul: 장도원; born March 20, 1954) is a South Korean-born American businessman. He founded the clothing store chain Forever 21 with his wife Jin Sook Chang.

== Early life ==
Chang grew up in South Korea and moved to California in 1981 with his wife, Jin Sook Chang. He never attended university and worked in coffee shops growing up.

== Career ==
He and his wife, Jin Sook (Hangul: 진숙), opened a 900-square foot clothing store then named Fashion 21 in 1984 in Highland Park, Los Angeles with only $11,000 in savings. The store took off, and as they expanded to other locations, the store's name was changed to Forever 21 otherwise known as XXI. The number of stores grew to 600, with 30,000 employees by 2015. The company has remained a family-owned operation. It has filed for bankruptcy protection as of 2019.

== Personal life ==
Do Won Chang and Jin Sook Chang have two children, and live in Beverly Hills, California. They are Christians, which is why John 3:16 is on the bottom of every bag.

Their two daughters, Esther and Linda Chang co-founded the company Riley Rose, a make-up and accessory company that Forever 21 carries in its stores. Linda was also in charge of marketing at Forever 21, while Esther was in charge of visual design.

== Philanthropy ==
The Changs have donated money to churches and faith groups, and Do Won travels to perform missionary work.
