= Howard Matz =

American judge

A. Howard Matz
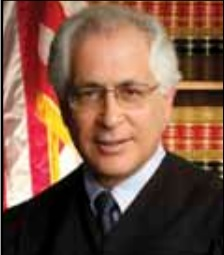
- circa 2012

Senior Judge of the United States District Court for the Central District of California
- In office July 11, 2011 – April 1, 2013

Judge of the United States District Court for the Central District of California
- In office June 29, 1998 – July 11, 2011
- Appointed by: Bill Clinton
- Preceded by: Harry Lindley Hupp
- Succeeded by: Michael W. Fitzgerald

Personal details
- Born: August 3, 1943 (age 82) Brooklyn, New York, U.S.
- Education: Columbia University (AB); Harvard Law School (JD)

Alvin Howard Matz (born August 3, 1943) is a former United States district judge of the United States District Court for the Central District of California.

== Education and career ==
Matz was born in Brooklyn, New York. He received an Artium Baccalaureus degree from Columbia University in 1965 and a Juris Doctor from Harvard Law School in 1968. Matz clerked for Judge Morris E. Lasker of the United States District Court for the Southern District of New York, and was in private practice in New York from 1970 to 1972. Matz moved to Los Angeles with the law firm of Hughes Hubbard & Reed, where he worked from 1972 to 1974. He served as an Assistant U.S. Attorney for the Central District of California from 1974 to 1978, and was Chief of the Special Prosecutions unit from 1977 to 1978, when he left to return to Hughes Hubbard as a partner.

== Federal judicial service ==
On October 27, 1997, President Bill Clinton nominated Matz to a seat on the Central District of California vacated by Harry Lindley Hupp. Matz was unanimously confirmed by the Senate on June 26, 1998, and received his commission on June 29, 1998. He assumed senior status on July 11, 2011, and retired on April 1, 2013.

== Notable rulings ==
- Matz presided over the first legal challenge to the U.S. government's treatment of Guantanamo Bay detainees in a habeas corpus petition brought by a civil rights group seeking relief for the detainees.
- Matz was the judge in Perfect 10 v. Google, Inc., a copyright case in which Perfect 10 sued Google for displaying thumbnail-sized reproductions of its images. Matz rejected Google's fair use defense, distinguishing Kelly v. Arriba Soft Corporation. The Ninth Circuit reversed in Perfect 10, Inc. v. Amazon.com, Inc..

== See also ==
- List of Jewish American jurists

Legal offices
| Preceded by Harry Lindley Hupp | Judge of the United States District Court for the Central District of California; 1998–2011 | Succeeded by Michael W. Fitzgerald |
