= Emmen =

Emmen may refer to:

- Emmen, Netherlands, a town and municipality in the Province of Drenthe
  - FC Emmen, an association football club
- Emmen, Overijssel, a hamlet in the municipality of Dalfsen
- Emmen, Switzerland, a city in the Canton of Lucerne
- Emmen, Germany, a village in the district Gifhorn, Lower Saxony

== See also ==
- Emen (disambiguation)
- Emme (disambiguation)
