= Ralph E. Jenney =

American judge

Judge of the United States District Court for the Southern District of California
- In office July 3, 1937 – July 13, 1945
- Appointed by: Franklin D. Roosevelt
- Preceded by: Albert Lee Stephens Sr.
- Succeeded by: William Carey Mathes

Personal details
- Born: Ralph Edward Jenney; February 20, 1883 Detroit, Michigan, U.S.
- Died: July 13, 1945 (aged 62)
- Education: University of Michigan (A.B.); University of Michigan Law School (LL.B.)

Ralph Edward Jenney (February 20, 1883 – July 13, 1945) was a United States district judge of the United States District Court for the Southern District of California.

== Education and career ==
Jenney was born on February 20, 1883, in Detroit, Michigan, to Royal A. and Caliphernia (née Hoxsey) Jenney. In 1900, he graduated from high school at Ann Arbor High School in Ann Arbor, Michigan. He received an Artium Baccalaureus degree from the University of Michigan in 1904 followed by a Bachelor of Laws from the University of Michigan Law School in 1906. Jenney was admitted to the bar in Michigan in 1906 and moved to Oregon in 1908. That year he was admitted to the Oregon bar and entered private legal practice in Portland where he remained until 1912. He was in private practice of law in San Diego, California, from 1912 to 1937.

== Federal judicial service ==
On June 23, 1937, President Franklin D. Roosevelt nominated Jenney to serve on the United States District Court for the Southern District of California to replace Judge Albert Lee Stephens Sr. who had been elevated to the United States Court of Appeals for the Ninth Circuit. Jenney was confirmed by the United States Senate on June 29, 1937, and received his commission on July 3, 1937. He served until his death on July 13, 1945, at the age of 62.

Legal offices
| Preceded by Albert Lee Stephens Sr. | Judge of the United States District Court for the Southern District of California; 1937–1945 | Succeeded by William Carey Mathes |
