= William Carey Mathes =

American judge

Senior Judge of the United States District Court for the Southern District of California
- In office June 9, 1965 – July 24, 1967

Chief Judge of the United States District Court for the Southern District of California
- In office 1964–1965
- Preceded by: Peirson Mitchell Hall
- Succeeded by: William Matthew Byrne Sr.

Judge of the United States District Court for the Southern District of California
- In office October 17, 1945 – June 9, 1965
- Appointed by: Harry S. Truman
- Preceded by: Ralph E. Jenney
- Succeeded by: Irving Hill

Personal details
- Born: William Carey Mathes; December 17, 1899 Hale Center, Texas, U.S.
- Died: July 24, 1967 (aged 67)
- Education: University of Texas at Austin (B.B.A.); Harvard Law School (LL.B.)

William Carey Mathes (December 17, 1899 – July 24, 1967) was a United States district judge of the United States District Court for the Southern District of California.

== Education and career ==
Born in Hale Center, Texas, Mathes received a B.B.A. degree (Note: Unable to ascertain the identity of this bachelor degree. Unlikely to be the Bachelor of Musical Arts, which is the modern usage of these initials.) from the University of Texas at Austin in 1921 and a Bachelor of Laws from Harvard Law School in 1924. He was in private practice in Los Angeles, California from 1924 to 1945. In 1943, Mathes served as President of the Los Angeles County Bar Association.

== Federal judicial service ==
On September 24, 1945, Mathes was nominated by President Harry S. Truman to a seat on the United States District Court for the Southern District of California vacated by Judge Ralph E. Jenney. Mathes was confirmed by the United States Senate on October 11, 1945, and received his commission on October 17, 1945. He was a member of the Judicial Conference of the United States from 1958 to 1960. He served as Chief Judge from 1964 to 1965, assuming senior status on June 9, 1965. Mathes served in that capacity until his death on July 24, 1967.

=== Notable case ===
Mathes was the trial judge in the case of Kawakita v. United States, which eventually went before the Supreme Court of the United States.

== Sources ==
https://www.tshaonline.org/handbook/entries/mathes-william-carey-jr

Legal offices
Preceded by Ralph E. Jenney	Judge of the United States District Court for the Southern District of California; 1945–1965	Succeeded by Irving Hill
Preceded by Peirson Mitchell Hall	Chief Judge of the United States District Court for the Southern District of California; 1964–1965	Succeeded by William Matthew Byrne Sr.
