= William Matthew Byrne Sr. =

American judge (1896–1974)

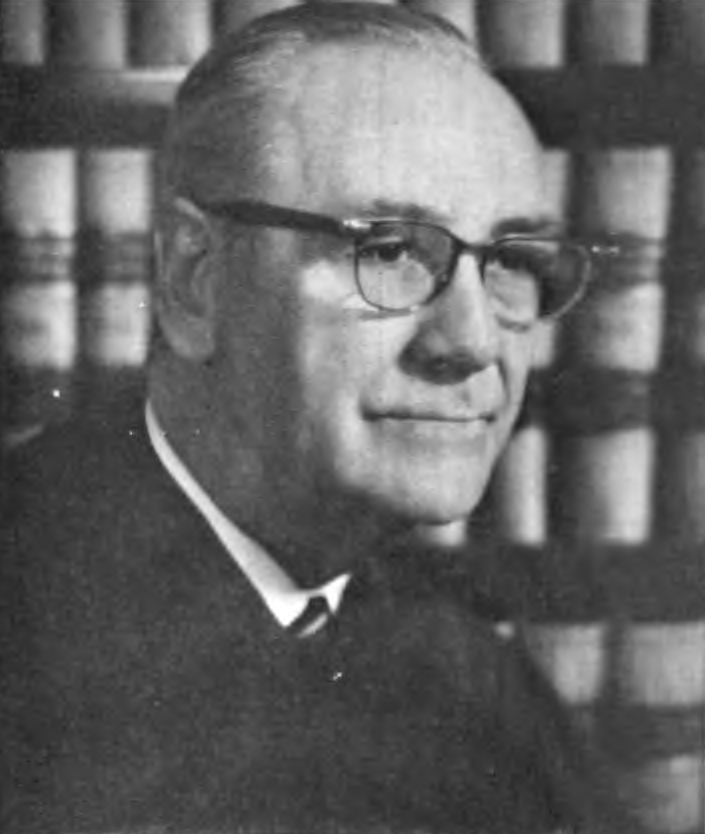

Senior Judge of the United States District Court for the Central District of California
- In office September 18, 1966 – March 9, 1974

Senior Judge of the United States District Court for the Southern District of California
- In office June 30, 1966 – September 18, 1966

Chief Judge of the United States District Court for the Southern District of California
- In office 1965–1966
- Preceded by: William Carey Mathes
- Succeeded by: Thurmond Clarke

Judge of the United States District Court for the Southern District of California
- In office September 27, 1950 – June 30, 1966
- Appointed by: Harry S. Truman
- Preceded by: James F. T. O'Connor
- Succeeded by: A. Andrew Hauk

Member of the California State Assembly from the 66th district
- In office January 5, 1925 - January 5, 1931
- Preceded by: Otto J. Emme
- Succeeded by: James E. Stockwell

Personal details
- Born: William Matthew Byrne; July 10, 1896 Bakersfield, California, U.S.
- Died: March 9, 1974 (aged 77)
- Party: Republican
- Children: William Matthew Byrne Jr.
- Education: Loyola Law School (LL.B.)

Military service
- Branch/service: United States Navy
- Battles/wars: World War I

William Matthew Byrne Sr. (July 10, 1896 – March 9, 1974) was a United States district judge of the United States District Court for the Southern District of California.

== Education and career ==
Born in Bakersfield, California, Byrne received a Bachelor of Laws from Loyola Law School in Los Angeles, California in 1929. He was in the United States Navy from 1917 to 1919. He was in private practice in Los Angeles from 1929 to 1943. He was a member of the California State Assembly from 1925 to 1931, serving as Speaker pro tem from 1927 to 1931. He was a Judge of the Los Angeles Municipal Court from 1943 to 1948. He was a Judge of the Superior Court of California from 1948 to 1950.

== Federal judicial service ==
Byrne received a recess appointment from President Harry S. Truman on September 27, 1950, to a seat on the United States District Court for the Southern District of California vacated by Judge James Francis Thaddeus O'Connor. He was nominated to the same position by President Truman on November 27, 1950. He was confirmed by the United States Senate on December 13, 1950, and received his commission on December 21, 1950. He served as Chief Judge from 1965 to 1966. He assumed senior status on June 30, 1966. Byrne was reassigned by operation of law to the United States District Court for the Central District of California on September 18, 1966, pursuant to 80 Stat. 75. His service terminated on March 9, 1974, due to his death.

== Sources ==
Legal offices
Preceded by James Francis Thaddeus O'Connor	Judge of the United States District Court for the Southern District of California; 1950–1966	Succeeded by A. Andrew Hauk
Preceded by William Carey Mathes	Chief Judge of the United States District Court for the Southern District of California; 1965–1966	Succeeded by Thurmond Clarke
