= Mary DeRosa =

American lawyer

Mary B. DeRosa is currently a Professor from Practice at the Georgetown University Law Center. She previously served as Deputy Counsel to the President for National Security Affairs in the Obama administration and Legal Adviser in the Clinton administration.

== Education and legal career ==
DeRosa attended the University of Virginia, receiving a BA with honors in 1981. She then attended George Washington University Law School, receiving a JD with high honors in 1984. At GWU, she was a Notes Editor on The George Washington Law Review and a member of the Order of the Coif. After law school, DeRosa spent a year as a clerk for Richard J. Cardamone, a Judge of the United States Court of Appeals for the Second Circuit. She spent the next six years as an associate with the law firm Arnold & Porter.

== Clinton administration ==
From 1995 to 1997, DeRosa served as a Special Counsel to the General Counsel of the Department of Defense (then Judith A. Miller). She focused on the Defense Department's investigative capabilities, litigation, and special projects. In 1997, she moved to the United States National Security Council, serving as a Deputy Legal Adviser until 2000 when she was promoted to Legal Adviser. She served in this position until the end of President Bill Clinton's term.

== Bush administration ==
In 2002, DeRosa joined the Center for Strategic and International Studies, a prominent foreign policy think tank in Washington, D.C., as a Senior Fellow in the Technology and Public Policy Program. From early 2007 through January, 2009 she served as Chief Counsel for National Security to the United States Senate Committee on the Judiciary under Democratic Senator Patrick Leahy.

== Obama administration ==
In 2009, with the election of another Democratic President, DeRosa returned to the White House, this time as Deputy Counsel to the President for National Security Affairs and Legal Adviser to the National Security Council. She had previously served on the Obama-Biden transition team. DeRosa served in this position until mid-2011, when she left to become Alternate Representative of the United States at the Sixty-sixth session of the United Nations General Assembly. After the end of the session, DeRosa returned to Washington, D.C., as a Distinguished Visitor from Practice at the Georgetown University Law Center.

DeRosa is Senior Advisor at the Chertoff Group, a company that provides security and risk management advisory services. As Senior Advisor she focuses on the areas National Security and Cybersecurity, Civil Liberties and Internet Privacy, Homeland Security and Terrorism and Immigration Law and Policy.
