= Harry Lindley Hupp =

American judge

Senior Judge of the United States District Court for the Central District of California
- In office April 1, 1997 – January 27, 2004

Judge of the United States District Court for the Central District of California
- In office March 21, 1984 – April 1, 1997
- Appointed by: Ronald Reagan
- Preceded by: A. Andrew Hauk
- Succeeded by: Howard Matz

Personal details
- Born: Harry Lindley Hupp; April 5, 1929 Los Angeles, California, U.S.
- Died: January 27, 2004 (aged 74) San Gabriel, California, U.S.
- Education: Pomona College; Stanford University (A.B.); Stanford Law School (LL.B.)

Harry Lindley Hupp (April 5, 1929 – January 27, 2004) was a United States district judge of the United States District Court for the Central District of California.

== Education and career ==
Born in Los Angeles, California, Hupp attended Beverly Hills High School. He also attended Pomona College from 1947 to 1950. He was in the United States Army from 1950 to 1952. He received an Artium Baccalaureus from Stanford University in 1953 and a Bachelor of Laws from Stanford Law School in 1955. He was in private practice in Los Angeles from 1955 to 1972, and was then a judge on the Superior Court, Los Angeles, California from 1972 to 1984.

== Federal judicial service ==
On February 14, 1984, Hupp was nominated by President Ronald Reagan to a seat on the United States District Court for the Central District of California vacated by Judge A. Andrew Hauk. Hupp was confirmed by the United States Senate on March 20, 1984, and received his commission on March 21, 1984. He assumed senior status on April 1, 1997, serving in that capacity until his death of a massive stroke suffered at his home in San Gabriel, California, on January 27, 2004.

== Sources ==
Legal offices
Preceded by A. Andrew Hauk	Judge of the United States District Court for the Central District of California; 1984–1997	Succeeded by Howard Matz
