= How (book) =

2007 book by Dov Seidman

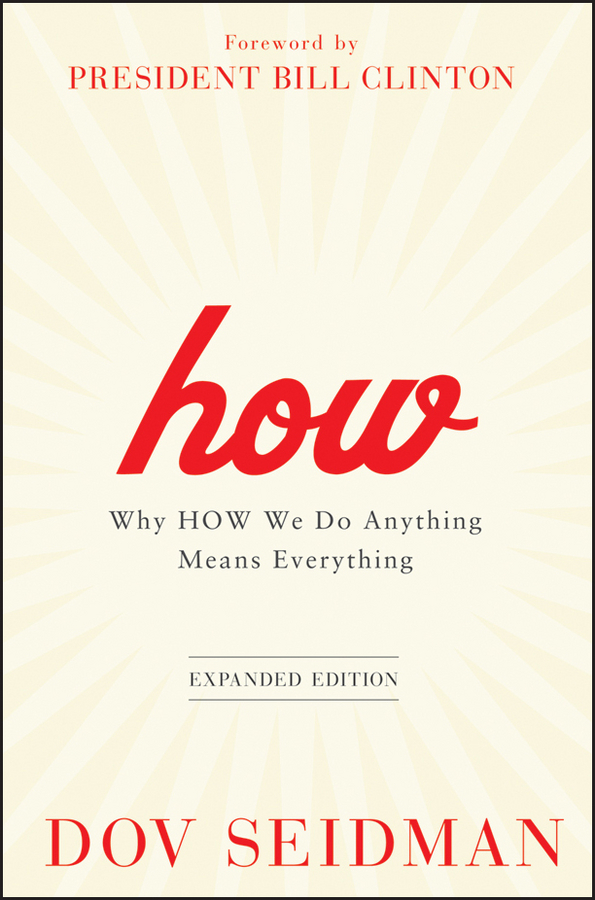
- How 2011 edition cover
- Author: Dov Seidman
- Language: English
- Subject: Organizational behavior
- Publisher: John Wiley & Sons
- Publication date: 2007
- ISBN: 978-1-118-10637-2

How is a 2007 book by Dov Seidman dealing with the topics of organizational behavior, leadership, and moral philosophy? Since 2011, Seidman has also written The How Column, which has appeared in several publications and previously appeared in Business Week. He has also given presentations about the topic.

== Origins ==
The book was created based on Seidman's training in law and moral philosophy, and what he learned at the organizational consulting firm he founded, LRN, Seidman developed the "shared values" recommendations of How at LRN, which for his company are humility, integrity, passion, and truth.

Thomas Friedman has expanded the How framework in a series of New York Times columns, usually involving interviews with Seidman, to apply to societal issues involving moral philosophy. These include the interaction of privacy and technology, attacks on democracy the purpose of humanity after technology displaces work and the escalation of "moral outrage" to protests.

An expanded version of the book with a foreword by Bill Clinton appeared in 2011. By November of that year, the expanded version was at number 13 in the "Advice, How-To, and Miscellaneous" section of the New York Times Best Seller list.

== Overview ==
Seidman argues that the intention of leaders to have their organizations behave well is not enough, and that "blind obedience" to leaders and rules is much less effective in creating a successful organization than one where shared values are internalized and believed by staff who govern their behavior. Self-governance organizations can respond better than one where rules and commands are viewed as obstacles to be skirted. Seidman argues that technology has allowed individual behavior to affect the contemporary world much more than it has previously, for good or bad.

The book says that companies that earn trust can translate that trust into direct economic benefits, such as more consumer sales or being charged lower interest rates. Through transparency and trust, an organization improves its reputation, which translates into more long-term business.
