= Wesley Hsu =

American judge (born 1971)

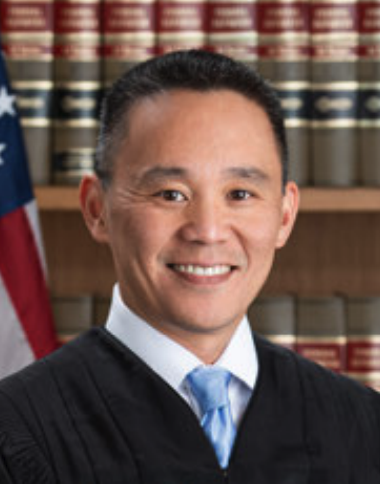

Judge of the United States District Court for the Central District of California
- Incumbent
- Assumed office May 12, 2023
- Appointed by: Joe Biden
- Preceded by: Virginia A. Phillips

Judge of the Los Angeles County Superior Court
- In office 2017 – May 12, 2023
- Appointed by: Jerry Brown
- Succeeded by: Christine Gonong

Personal details
- Born: Wesley Liu Hsu; 1971 (age 54–55) St. Louis, Missouri, U.S.
- Party: Democratic
- Education: Yale University (BA, JD)

Wesley Liu Hsu (born 1971) is an American lawyer who is serving as a United States district judge of the United States District Court for the Central District of California. He previously served as a judge of the Los Angeles County Superior Court from California from 2017 to 2023.

== Early life and education ==
While in high school, Hsu's parents were struck and severely injured by a drunk driver while crossing a street. His father suffered a broken rib and his mother went into a coma that lasted for two and a half months. The driver was sentenced to eight months in jail. Hsu, who thought the light sentence was an injustice to his parents, decided to pursue a legal career. He received a Bachelor of Arts from Yale University in 1993 and a Juris Doctor from Yale Law School in 1996.

== Career ==
From 1996 to 1997, he served as a law clerk for Judge Mariana Pfaelzer of the United States District Court for the Central District of California. From 1997 to 2000, he was an associate at Gibson, Dunn and Crutcher LLP in Los Angeles. From 2000 to 2017, he served as an assistant United States attorney in the U.S. Attorney's Office for the Central District of California, including from 2008 to 2015 as chief of the Cyber Crimes and Intellectual Property Crimes section and from 2015 to 2017 as executive assistant U.S. attorney. On November 2, 2017, Hsu was appointed as a judge of the Los Angeles County Superior Court by California Governor Jerry Brown. He left in 2023 when he was commissioned as a federal judge.

=== Notable cases ===
In 2009, Hsu prosecuted Michael Barrett, who pled guilty to secretly filming ESPN reporter Erin Andrews while she was nude. Barrett was accused of altering peepholes in the doors of two hotel rooms.

In 2010, Hsu prosecuted Gilberto Sanchez, who was accused of pirating the movie The Wolverine.

In 2015, Hsu prosecuted Hunter Moore, who pled guilty to federal computer hacking and identity theft charges for hiring another man to hack into e-mail accounts to steal nude photos that were later posted on his website. Moore created the site IsAnyoneUp.com, which allowed for widespread publication and dissemination of revenge porn.

=== Federal judicial service ===
On December 21, 2022, President Joe Biden announced his intent to nominate Hsu to serve as a United States district judge of the United States District Court for the Central District of California. On January 23, 2023, his nomination was sent to the Senate. President Biden nominated him to the seat vacated by Judge Virginia A. Phillips, who assumed senior status on February 14, 2022. On February 15, 2023, a hearing on his nomination was held before the Senate Judiciary Committee. On April 20, 2023, his nomination was reported out of committee by a 13–8 vote. On May 3, 2023, the United States Senate invoked cloture on his nomination by a 54–45 vote. Later that day, his nomination was confirmed by a 53–43 vote. He received his judicial commission on May 12, 2023.

==== Notable rulings ====
On May 12, 2025, Hsu ruled in favor of an environmental groups challenging the US Forest Service's decision to not provide Endangered Species Act protections to the Joshua tree, stating “that the Service has not provided a rational explanation as to why climate change alone does not threaten the species to become threatened or endangered.”

Hsu was a member of a three-judge panel that oversaw a challenge to California's congressional districts as implemented by Proposition 50 in response to the mid-decade redistricting in Texas. On January 14, 2026, Hsu was part of the 2–1 majority decision upholding the constitutionality of the California map, rejecting claims by the California Republican Party and the US Department of Justice under President Donald Trump that the map was racially gerrymandered.

== See also ==
- List of Asian American jurists

Legal offices
Preceded by Virginia A. Phillips	Judge of the United States District Court for the Central District of California; 2023–present	Incumbent
