= Virginia A. Phillips =

American judge (born 1957)

Virginia Anne Phillips

Senior Judge of the United States District Court for the Central District of California
- Incumbent
- Assumed office February 14, 2022

Chief Judge of the United States District Court for the Central District of California
- In office July 1, 2016 – May 31, 2020
- Preceded by: George H. King
- Succeeded by: Cormac J. Carney

Judge of the United States District Court for the Central District of California
- In office November 15, 1999 – February 14, 2022
- Appointed by: Bill Clinton
- Preceded by: William Matthew Byrne Jr.
- Succeeded by: Wesley Hsu

Magistrate Judge of the United States District Court for the Central District of California
- In office 1995–1999

Personal details
- Born: Virginia Anne Ettinger; February 14, 1957 (age 69) Orange, California, U.S.
- Education: University of California, Riverside (BA); University of California, Berkeley (JD)

Virginia Anne Phillips (née Ettinger; born February 14, 1957) is a senior United States district judge of the United States District Court for the Central District of California.

== Early life and education ==
Born (as Virginia Ettinger) and raised in Orange, California, Phillips received a Bachelor of Arts degree from the University of California, Riverside, in 1979 and a Juris Doctor from the University of California, Berkeley School of Law in 1982.

== Career ==
Phillips was in private practice in Riverside, California, from 1982 to 1991. She was a Commissioner for the Riverside County Superior Court from 1991 to 1995.

=== Federal judicial service ===
In 1995, Phillips became a United States magistrate judge of the Central District of California. On January 26, 1999, Phillips was nominated by President Bill Clinton to be a United States district judge of the United States District Court for the Central District of California, to a seat vacated by Judge William Matthew Byrne Jr. She was confirmed by the United States Senate on November 10, 1999, and received her commission on November 15, 1999. Phillips served as chief judge from July 1, 2016 to May 31, 2020. Phillips assumed senior status on February 14, 2022, her 65th birthday.

== Notable cases ==
On September 9, 2010, Phillips ruled that the United States Department of Defense's "don't ask, don't tell" policy is unconstitutional in the case Log Cabin Republicans v. United States of America. On October 12, Phillips issued a permanent worldwide injunction ordering the military to immediately "suspend and discontinue any investigation, or discharge, separation, or other proceeding, that may have been commenced" under "don't ask, don't tell". The Ninth Circuit stayed the injunction pending appeal but on July 6, 2011, lifted the stay. On September 29, 2011, the Ninth Circuit vacated the district court's decision, ruling that the legislative repeal of "don't ask, don't tell" had rendered the case moot.

== Sources ==
- Butler, Ed (October 2007). "BenchMarks: Virginia A. Phillips" (PDF). San Bernardino County Bar Association. San Bernardino, California: 4–5. Archived from the original (PDF) on November 29, 2010.

Legal offices
Preceded by William Matthew Byrne Jr.	Judge of the United States District Court for the Central District of California; 1999–2022	Succeeded by Wesley Hsu
Preceded by George H. King	Chief Judge of the United States District Court for the Central District of California; 2016–2020	Succeeded by Cormac J. Carney
