= William Matthew Byrne Jr. =

American judge (1930–2006)

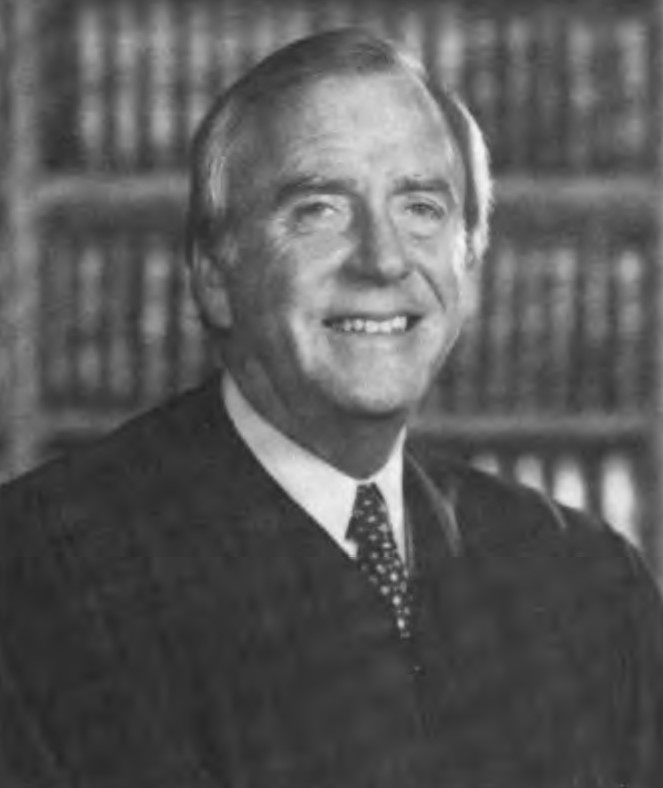

Senior Judge of the United States District Court for the Central District of California
- In office February 28, 1998 – January 12, 2006

Chief Judge of the United States District Court for the Central District of California
- In office 1994–1998
- Preceded by: Manuel Real
- Succeeded by: Terry J. Hatter Jr.

Judge of the United States District Court for the Central District of California
- In office May 20, 1971 – February 28, 1998
- Appointed by: Richard Nixon
- Preceded by: Seat established by 84 Stat. 294
- Succeeded by: Virginia A. Phillips

United States Attorney for the Central District of California
- In office March 26, 1967 – May 18, 1970
- President: Lyndon B. Johnson; Richard Nixon
- Preceded by: John K. Van de Kamp
- Succeeded by: Robert L. Meyer

Personal details
- Born: William Matthew Byrne Jr. September 3, 1930 Los Angeles, California, U.S.
- Died: January 12, 2006 (aged 75) Los Feliz, California, U.S.
- Parent: William Matthew Byrne Sr. (father)
- Education: University of Southern California (BS, LLB)

William Matthew Byrne Jr. (September 3, 1930 – January 14, 2006) was a United States district judge of the United States District Court for the Central District of California.

== Education and career ==
Born in Los Angeles, California, Byrne received a Bachelor of Science degree from University of Southern California in 1953 and a Bachelor of Laws from USC Gould School of Law in 1956. He clerked for Judge Peirson Mitchell Hall of the United States District Court for the Southern District of California, and enlisted in the United States Air Force in 1956 where he spent two years in the JAG Corps. He then went to work as an Assistant United States Attorney for the Southern District of California from 1958 to 1960, and was in private practice in Los Angeles for the next seven years. President Lyndon B. Johnson named him United States Attorney for the Central District of California in 1967. In 1970, Richard Nixon appointed him executive director of the President's Commission on Campus Unrest. He was also an adjunct professor at Loyola Law School.

== Federal judicial service ==
On April 21, 1971, President Richard Nixon nominated Byrne to a new seat on the United States District Court for the Central District of California created by 84 Stat. 294. He was confirmed by the United States Senate on May 20, and received his commission the same day. Byrne served as Chief Judge from 1994 to 1998. He assumed senior status on February 28, 1998. His served in that capacity until his death on January 12, 2006, in Los Feliz, Los Angeles, California.

== Pentagon Papers trial ==
Byrne was assigned the Pentagon Papers case the same year he arrived on the bench. In the midst of the trial, several twists served to destroy the government's case. The first revelation came on April 26, 1973, when the government prosecutor disclosed that White House operatives had burgled the Beverly Hills office of Ellsberg's psychiatrist. The burglars, led by G. Gordon Liddy and E. Howard Hunt, were not apprehended until after they burgled the Democratic National Committee headquarters at the Watergate complex in Washington nine months later.

Days after the disclosure, Richard Nixon's two top lieutenants, John Ehrlichman and H.R. Haldeman, resigned, and White House counsel John Dean was fired. A few days later, Byrne disclosed in court that Ehrlichman had offered him the position of FBI director. On May 9, Byrne learned of yet another illegality: the FBI had secretly taped phone conversations between Ellsberg and Morton Halperin, who had supervised the Pentagon Papers study. Finally, when the government claimed it had lost all records of the wiretapping, Byrne declared a mistrial on May 11, 1973.

It was later learned that while Byrne was presiding over the pending Ellsberg trial, John D. Ehrlichman met with Byrne at Nixon's Western White House (La Casa Pacifica) in San Clemente, California, to discuss the judge's becoming director of the FBI. According to Ehrlichman's later testimony Byrne was eager for the appointment, while Byrne stated that he had refused to consider the appointment during the pending trial. Neither Byrne nor Ehrlichman revealed this discussion about the FBI directorship to the litigants in the Ellsberg case until his visit was discovered by the press. Ultimately, Byrne was not nominated as director of the FBI.

== See also ==
- Lyndon B. Johnson judicial appointment controversies

== Sources ==
Legal offices
Preceded by Seat established by 84 Stat. 294	Judge of the United States District Court for the Central District of California; 1971–1998	Succeeded by Virginia A. Phillips
Preceded by Manuel Real	Chief Judge of the United States District Court for the Central District of California; 1994–1998	Succeeded by Terry J. Hatter Jr.
