= Abe Krash =

- Born: April 26, 1927; Menominee, Michigan, U.S.
- Died: July 6, 2024 (aged 97); Chevy Chase, Maryland, U.S.
- Education: University of Chicago (BA, JD) Yale Law School (fellow)
- Occupations: Lawyer, professor
- Spouse: Joan Lee
- Children: 2

Abraham Krash (April 26, 1927 – July 6, 2024) was an American lawyer and law professor known for his work at Arnold, Fortas & Porter and his contribution to the Supreme Court case Gideon v. Wainwright (1963), which established the right to government-appointed counsel for indigent criminal defendants.

== Early life and education ==
Krash was born on April 26, 1927, in Menominee, Michigan, to Hyman Krash, a rabbi, and Florence Kaplan. His family relocated frequently for his father's rabbinical work, living in cities including Marinette, Wisconsin; Salt Lake City, Utah; and Washington, D.C. Growing up in Cheyenne, Wyoming, during the Great Depression and World War II, Krash attended public schools, edited the student newspaper, and excelled in state oratory and debate competitions. He enrolled at the University of Chicago in 1944, earning a Bachelor of Philosophy in 1946. Krash, as editor-in-chief of The Chicago Maroon in 1945, inadvertently published a profile on physicist Arthur Holly Compton that referenced his work on atomic energy, nearly breaching Manhattan Project secrecy and prompting a military investigation. No charges were filed, and Krash later described the incident as an unintentional lead tied to the University of Chicago's role in the project. He later earned a J.D. degree in 1949 from the University of Chicago. From 1949 to 1950, he was a graduate fellow at Yale Law School.

== Career ==
Krash began his legal career in 1950 at Raoul Berger's practice in Washington, D.C. In 1953, he joined Arnold, Fortas & Porter as an associate and became a partner in 1960. He led the firm's antitrust practice group until his retirement from the partnership in 1998, after which he continued as an emeritus partner. He worked closely with Abe Fortas and mentored Merrick Garland. He worked on the case of Durham v. United States (1954), which established the standard for insanity in criminal cases. In the 1960s, he was a member of President Lyndon B. Johnson's Commission on Crime in the District of Columbia. From the late 1990s, he was president of the Friends of the Law Library of Congress. Krash received the American Lawyer Lifetime Achievement Award in 2013. He also served as a visiting professor of law at Georgetown University Law Center and Yale Law School.

=== Gideon v. Wainwright ===
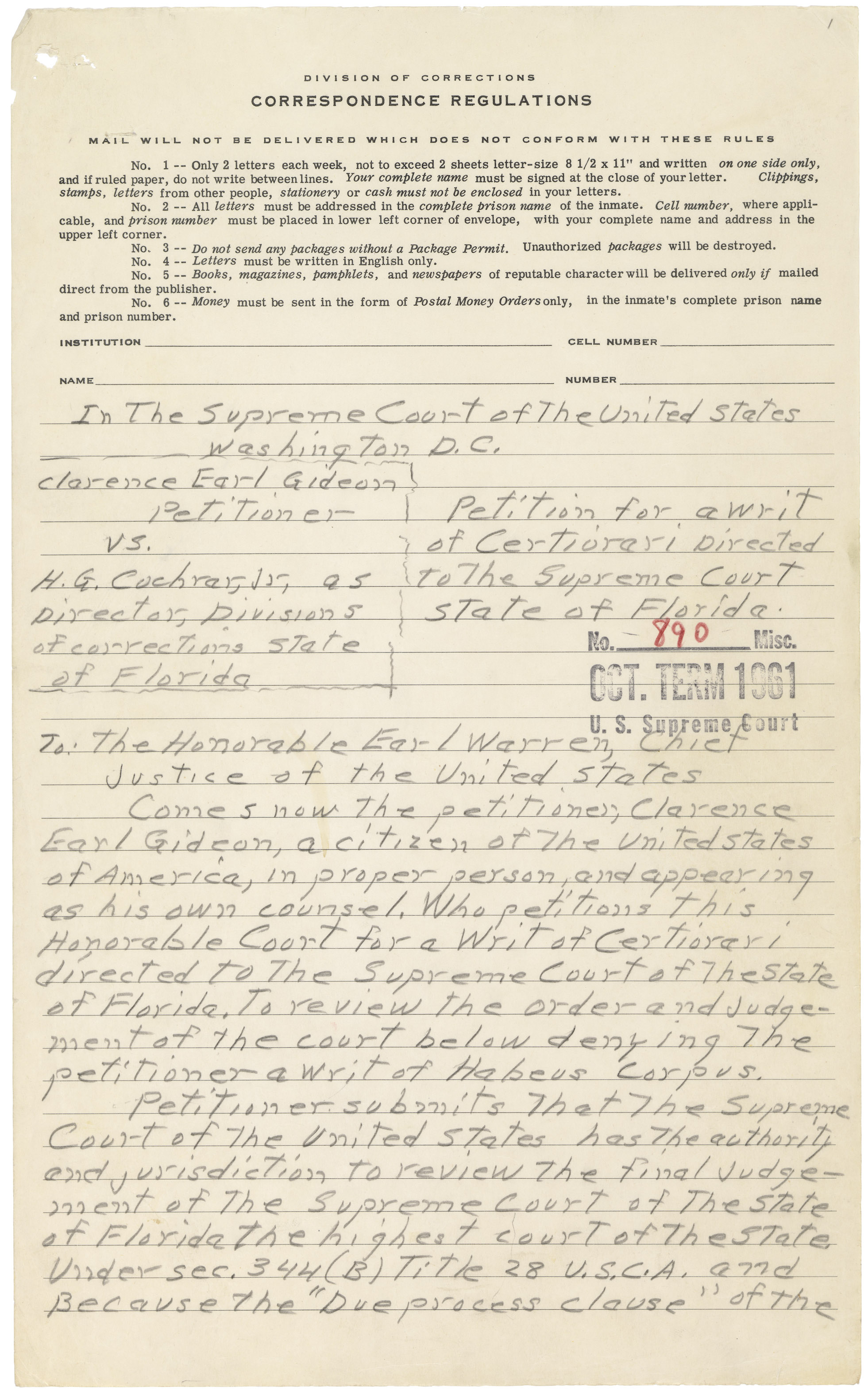
Gideon's petition for certiorari to the Supreme Court of the United States, which was eventually handled by Fortas and Krash

As a junior partner, Krash and John Hart Ely assisted Abe Fortas in researching and drafting the brief for Gideon v. Wainwright, a 1963 United States Supreme Court case that mandated state-provided counsel for indigent defendants in felony cases under the Sixth Amendment. He co-authored "The History of Gideon v. Wainwright" with Anthony Lewis in 1990 and advocated for public defender systems to implement the ruling. David Sheiner played him in Gideon's Trumpet (film). Attorney General Merrick Garland remarked that: "Krash never failed to emphasize to every new lawyer that Clarence Earl Gideon was the most important client the firm had ever represented. Ely and Krash knew that the integrity of the American justice system depends on effective representation for indigent defendants."

== Legal journal articles ==
- "Government Immunity from Discovery" (with Raoul Berger), Yale Law Journal, vol. 59, p. 1451 (1950).
- "Status of Independent Producers under the Natural Gas Act" (with Raoul Berger), Texas Law Review, vol. 30, p. 29 (1951).
- "A More Perfect Union: The Constitutional World of William Winslow Crosskey", University of Chicago Law Review, vol. 21, no. 1, p. 1 (1953).
- "The Durham Rule and Judicial Administration of the Insanity Defense in the District of Columbia", Yale Law Journal vol. 70, no. 6, p. 905 (1961).
- "Malcolm Sharp and the Rosenberg Case: Remembrance of Things Past", University of Chicago Law Review, vol. 33, p. 202 (1966).
- "William Winslow Crosskey", University of Chicago Law Review, vol. 35, no. 2, p. 232 (1968).
- Book Review: "The Trial of Lady Chatterley: Regina v. Penguin Books Ltd." (C. H. Rolph ed.), Yale Law Journal, vol. 71, no. 7, p. 1351 (1962).
- "Right to a Lawyer: The Implications of Gideon v. Wainwright", Notre Dame Law Review, vol. 39, no. 2, p. 150 (1964).
- "Some Reflections on the Causes of Crime", Virginia Law Review, vol. 53, p. 1479 (1967).
- "Ethics and the Megafirm", Loyola University Chicago Law Journal, vol. 16, no. 3, p. 475 (1985).
- "The History of Gideon v. Wainwright" (with Anthony Lewis), Pace Law Review, vol. 10, no. 2, p. 379 (1990).
- "My Friend Abe Goldstein", Yale Law Journal, vol. 115, no. 5, p. 505 (2005).
- "The Architects of the Gideon Decision: Abe Fortas and Justice Hugo Black", Texas Law Review, vol. 92, no. 5 (2014).
