= Margaret M. Morrow =

American judge (born 1950)

Margaret Mary Morrow
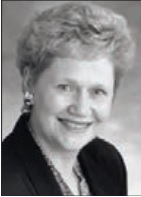

Senior Judge of the United States District Court for the Central District of California
- In office October 29, 2015 – January 6, 2016

Judge of the United States District Court for the Central District of California
- In office February 24, 1998 – October 29, 2015
- Appointed by: Bill Clinton
- Preceded by: Richard Arthur Gadbois Jr.
- Succeeded by: Hernán D. Vera

Personal details
- Born: October 29, 1950 (age 75) Columbus, Nebraska, U.S.
- Education: Bryn Mawr College (AB); Harvard University (JD)

Margaret Mary Morrow (born October 29, 1950) is a former United States district judge of the United States District Court for the Central District of California.

== Early life and education ==
Born in Columbus, Nebraska, Morrow received an Artium Baccalaureus degree cum laude from Bryn Mawr College in 1971. She received a Juris Doctor cum laude from Harvard Law School in 1974.

== Career ==
Morrow practiced law in Los Angeles from 1974 to 1998. She was counsel of record in several precedent-setting cases involving employment law, bad faith, insurance coverage and arbitration. In these years representing clients in civil law and criminal law, she represented a wide range of corporate and business involvements during both trial and appellate matters. From 1974 to 1987, she practiced with Kadison, Pfaelzer, Woodard, Quinn & Rossi. In 1987, she and others formed the law firm of Quinn, Kully and Morrow, that ultimately merged with the international law firm offices of Arnold & Porter in 1996. While an attorney in the Los Angeles office of Arnold & Porter, she specialized in appellate court litigation. In 1988 she served as president of the Los Angeles County Bar Association. She was elected president of the State Bar of California, then served as its first woman president from 1993 to 1994. In January 2016, Morrow joined the Los Angeles-based public interest law firm, Public Counsel, as its president and CEO.

=== Federal judicial service ===
Morrow was nominated to the United States District Court for the Central District of California by President Bill Clinton on January 7, 1997, to a seat vacated by Richard Arthur Gadbois Jr. She was confirmed by the United States Senate on February 11, 1998, and received her commission on February 24, 1998. She assumed senior status on October 29, 2015. She retired from active service on January 6, 2016.

=== Significant decisions ===
- Dr. Sam Chachoua vs. Cedars-Sinai Medical Center
- Vidal Sassoon vs. Procter & Gamble, Co.
- Martin D Fern vs. Matthew Bender & Company, Inc.
- Valueclick Inc vs. Revenue Science, Inc.
- United States vs. Reed Slatkin-Daniel W. Jacobs, et al.
- Marilyn Monroe LLC (MMLLC) and CMG Worldwide Inc. (CMG) vs. Milton H. Greene and Tom Kelley Studios

Legal offices
Preceded by Richard Arthur Gadbois Jr.	Judge of the United States District Court for the Central District of California; 1998–2015	Succeeded by Hernán D. Vera
