= LRN (company) =

American company

LRN Corporation
- Trade name: LRN
- Formerly: Legal Research Network Inc
- Type: Corporation
- Industry: Ethics and legal compliance education
- Founded: October 1994; 31 years ago
- Founder: Dov Seidman
- Headquarters: 41 Madison Avenue, New York City, United States
- Number of locations: New York City, London, Dublin, India
- Area served: Worldwide
- Key people: Dov Seidman (Chairman), Bob Lemmond (CEO)
- Number of employees: 522
- Website: lrn.com

LRN, founded in 1994, is an American company which provides advising and educating on ethics, regulatory compliance, and corporate culture to other organizations. When founded, the company focused on the legal industry and was named Legal Research Network, before expanding into other fields.

== History ==
=== Founding ===
Dov Seidman founded Legal Research Network (later changed to "LRN") two years out of Harvard Law School. Seidman's business plan was to offer legal knowledge and analysis services through an expert network of academics and lawyers. This research could then be repurposed in a database licensed to companies. He was able to pre-sell a $500,000 contract to MCI based on the idea. He raised $2 million from 42 investors to launch the company.

In its first year, LRN had a network of 1,100 legal experts in over 2,500 subjects reported by The Washington Post as being "mostly law professors, solo practitioners and lawyers on leave from their regular jobs".

=== Expansion into training ===
The company added ethics and compliance training in the late 1990s, in order to provide legal and ethical awareness throughout organizations, not just to their internal counsel. Online classes, starting in the 2000s, facilitated mass training of thousands of employees at large multi-nationals like Johnson & Johnson and Pfizer. Pfizer trained 150,000 of its employees with LRN courses. Subjects included compliance with sexual harassment laws, trade secrets and anti-trust.

As of 2000, 200 of the Fortune 500 companies were clients of LRN. Starting in the early 2000s, the company offered "common standards" for ethics and corporate compliance education. Competitors like Johnson & Johnson and Pfizer shared as much of 90% of the course materials, helping to standardize best practices for business ethics in corporate America.

Seidman testified in 2004 before the U.S. Sentencing Commission, regarding the Federal Sentencing Guidelines, about the need for companies to develop ethical cultures instead of "check-the-box", compliance-only approaches.

== Operations ==
=== Services ===
LRN's services include analyzing corporate cultures, rewriting their codes of conduct, and providing ethical-compliance education and training to their employees. LRN emphasizes principles and values rather than "blindly" following rules.

In its annual Ethics & Compliance Program Effectiveness Report, which is based on surveys of ethics, compliance, and legal executives from various industries around the world, LRN has found that companies with ethical workplace culture. in contrast to those that focused on rules and procedures, were less likely to experience misconduct among employees, and that 97% of values-based companies outperformed their competition. In both the 2021 and 2022 reports, the majority of people surveyed said their companies’ ethical cultures had been strengthened by their handling of the COVID-19 pandemic.

Its online education platform offers about 500 courses in 50 languages, on topics including international corruption law, intellectual property, data protection, and environmental sustainability. LRN ethics training materials include videos, blogs, quizzes, social media and video games. Dell told The Wall Street Journal in 2014 that LRN developed an ethics game for it entitled the "Honesty Project."

In 2021, LRN published a “Benchmark of Ethical Culture” report, based on surveys of approximately 8,000 employees of companies worldwide representing 17 industries. According to the report, companies with strong ethical cultures outperform other companies by 40 percent across several metrics including customer satisfaction, employee loyalty, and innovation.

=== Organization ===
LRN was originally headquartered in California, then moved its headquarters to New York City in 2012. It also has offices in London and India.

Job titles were largely eliminated from the company, according to a 2014 Wall Street Journal article. But, as of 2021, the company was using job titles such as “Chief Human Resources Officer“, "Chief Marketing Officer” and “Chief Financial Officer” again.

In 2007, Seidman published the book How, which discussed the business philosophy on which LRN is based. In it, he argues that companies that behave more ethically than their competitors will also outperform the competition financially.

Since 2008, LRN has been the corporate partner of The Elie Wiesel Foundation for Humanity’s Prize in Ethics Essay Contest, an annual competition for students to analyze ethical issues.

=== Finances ===
LRN received a $30 million investment from Softbank in 2000.

In 2018, Leeds Equity Partners made a “substantial” investment in LRN. The investment enabled LRN in 2020 to acquire Interactive Services, a Dublin-based e-learning company which offers workplace policy compliance training. The combined companies had about 40% of the Fortune 500 as clients, as of 2020.
