= Manuel Real =

American judge (1924–2019)

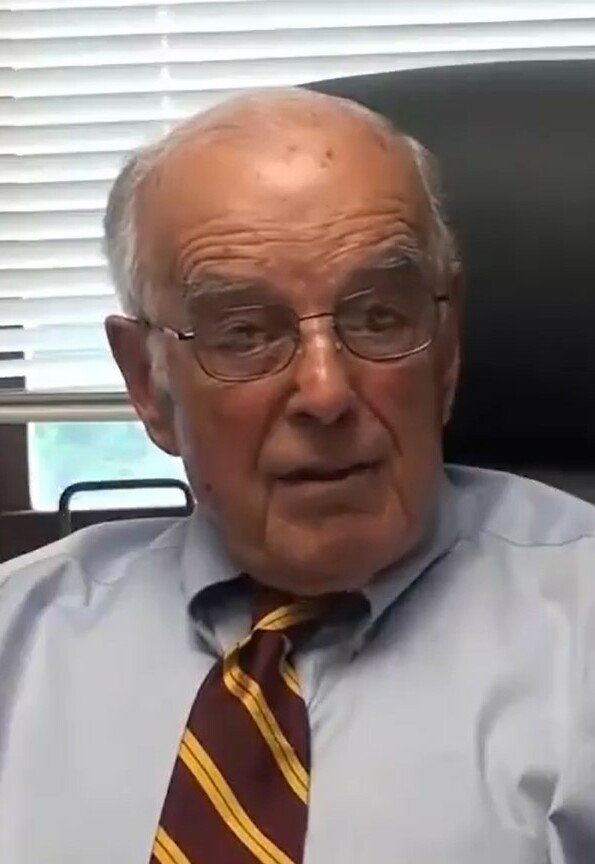
- Real in 2017

Senior Judge of the United States District Court for the Central District of California
- In office November 4, 2018 – June 26, 2019

Chief Judge of the United States District Court for the Central District of California
- In office 1982–1993
- Preceded by: A. Andrew Hauk
- Succeeded by: William Matthew Byrne Jr.

Judge of the United States District Court for the Central District of California
- In office November 3, 1966 – November 4, 2018
- Appointed by: Lyndon B. Johnson
- Preceded by: Seat established by 80 Stat. 75
- Succeeded by: Sherilyn Peace Garnett

Personal details
- Born: Manuel Lawrence Real; January 27, 1924 San Pedro, California, U.S.
- Died: June 26, 2019 (aged 95) Rancho Palos Verdes, California, U.S.
- Education: University of Southern California (B.S.); Loyola Marymount University (LL.B.)

Manuel Lawrence Real (January 27, 1924 – June 26, 2019) was an American lawyer and jurist who served as a United States district judge of the U.S. District Court for the Central District of California from 1966 until his death in 2019. He was appointed in 1966 by President Lyndon B. Johnson.

== Early life, education, and career ==
Born in San Pedro, California to Spanish immigrant parents, Real received a Bachelor of Science degree from the University of Southern California in 1944 and a Bachelor of Laws from Loyola Law School in 1951. He was in the United States Navy Reserve during World War II, from 1943 to 1945. He was an Assistant United States Attorney for the Southern District of California from 1952 to 1955. He was in private practice in San Pedro from 1955 to 1964. He was the United States Attorney for the Southern District of California from 1964 to 1966.

== Federal judicial service ==
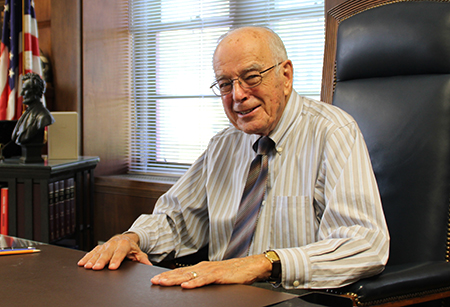
Real at 50 years of service

On September 26, 1966, Real was nominated by President Lyndon B. Johnson to a new seat on the United States District Court for the Central District of California created by 80 Stat. 75. He was confirmed by the United States Senate on October 20, 1966, and received his commission on November 3, 1966. He served as Chief Judge of the district from 1982 to 1993. In 2006, House Judiciary Committee Chairman Jim Sensenbrenner, R-Wis., introduced a resolution permitting the Judiciary Committee to hold an impeachment inquiry investigating Real to see whether impeachment hearings were warranted. The impeachment effort was later dropped. In 2008, Real received a public reprimand for his handling of a bankruptcy matter. Real assumed senior status on November 4, 2018. He was the last federal court judge in active service to have been appointed by President Johnson, and measured by length of active service the third-longest-serving federal judge ever, and the longest-serving since the Civil War. (Note: Real’s 52 years and one day in active service is exceeded only by: 1. Henry Potter of the District of North Carolina and the original Fifth Circuit with 56 years and 225 days; 2. William Cranch of the original District of Columbia Circuit with 54 years, 182 days) He died on June 26, 2019, aged 95.

== Decisions ==
=== Pasadena Unified School District ===
He was known for his January 22, 1970 decision ordering Pasadena Unified School District to adopt a plan to correct racial imbalance at all levels. "It is ordered, adjudged and decreed that the defendants, Pasadena City Board of Education, Mrs. LuVerne LaMotte, Albert C. Lowe, Bradford C. Houser, John T. Welsh, and Joseph J. Engholm, as members of the Pasadena City Board of Education, and Ralph W. Hornbeck, as Superintendent of Schools ... are enjoined from discriminating of the basis of race ... in the operation of the district." His decision: "Commencing in September of 1970, there shall be no school in the District elementary or junior high or senior high school, with a majority of any minority students." The board of education and the superintendent adopted a forced busing plan to meet the new legal mandate. Real did not order forced busing; that was creation of the Pasadena Unified School District.

=== Other cases ===
Real was noted for his judicial behavior in the 2000s. From 2001 to 2009, he had custody of disputed Filipino assets, for which he had to account in 2009. A federal appeals court panel ruled that his accounting "plainly fails to account for all transactions involving the assets during the eight years they were held in the clerk of court's custody. It doesn't give the reader even a basic understanding of the path by which $33.8 million worth of assets deposited in September 2000 came to be worth $34.7 million today".

On January 11, 2012, the Ninth Circuit removed Real from the controversial case of Alexander Sanchez, a former MS-13 gang leader turned gang interventionist. In November 2012 it was reported that Real had shown a pattern of making rulings in favor of companies in which he owned stock.

Real overturned the conviction of four men who conspired to rob a fictional cocaine stash house in a governmental reverse sting operation, citing outrageous government conduct. However, the 9th circuit reversed Real on May 17, 2016, and remanded the case to a different judge.

On April 12, 2018, Real ruled that the Justice Department cannot require police forces to comply with its immigration enforcement criteria in order to receive funding.

== See also ==
- List of Hispanic and Latino American jurists
- List of United States federal judges by longevity of service

== Notes ==
Legal offices
Preceded by Seat established by 80 Stat. 75	Judge of the United States District Court for the Central District of California; 1966–2018	Succeeded by Sherilyn Peace Garnett
Preceded by A. Andrew Hauk	Chief Judge of the United States District Court for the Central District of California; 1982–1993	Succeeded by William Matthew Byrne Jr.
