= Otto J. Emme =

American politician

Member of the California State Assembly from the 66th district
- In office January 8, 1923 - January 5, 1925
- Preceded by: Richmond Pitts Benton
- Succeeded by: William Matthew Byrne Sr.

Personal details
- Born: July 3, 1888 Topeka, Kansas, US
- Died: September 26, 1971 (aged 83) Los Angeles, California, US
- Party: Republican

Military service
- Branch/service: United States Navy
- Battles/wars: World War II

Otto Joseph Emme (July 3, 1888 - September 26, 1971) served in the California State Assembly for the 66th district from 1923 to 1925 and during World War I he served in the United States Navy Reserve.
