= Dov Seidman =

American author, columnist and businessman

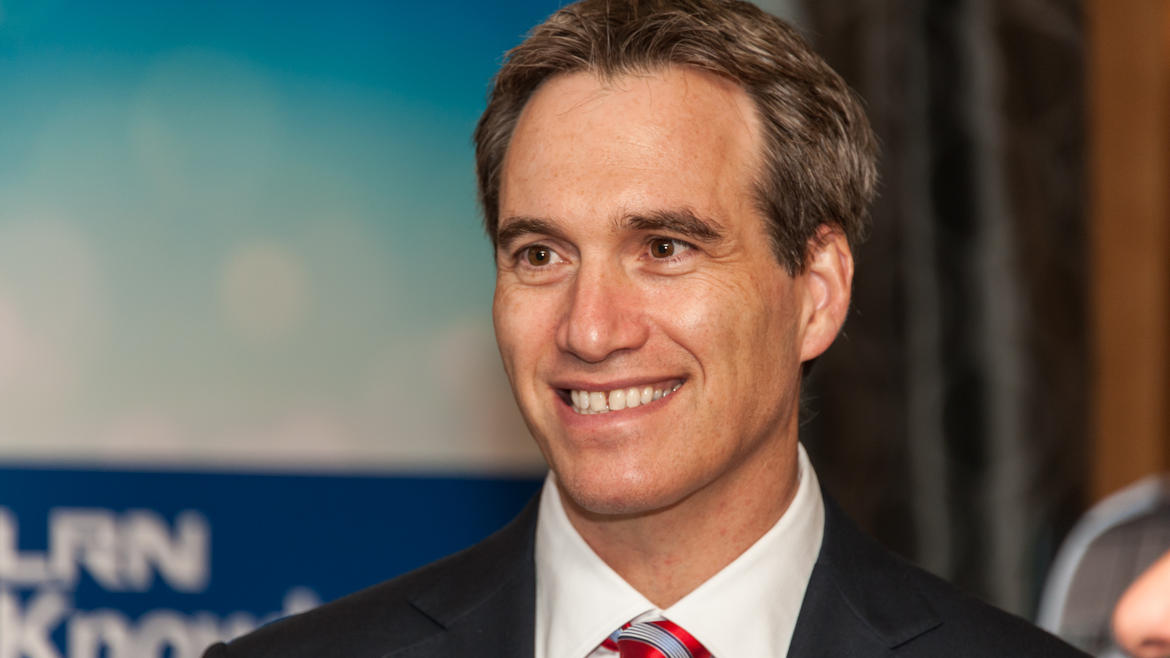
- Seidman at LRN Knowledge Forum 2014
- Born: May 13, 1964 (age 62); San Francisco, California, US
- Education: UCLA, Harvard Law School
- Occupations: Author; Chairman of the board Former CEO of LRN
- Website: www.dovseidman.com

Dov Seidman (born May 13, 1964) is an American author, columnist and businessman. He is the founder, chairman and former CEO of LRN, an ethics and compliance management firm. He is also the author of How, and founded The HOW Institute for Society.

== Early life and education ==
Seidman was born in San Francisco, California. His father, Alex, was a Polish-born physician who died in 1992. At the age of 3, Seidman moved to Israel with his mother and two siblings. He returned to the United States in 1977, when he was 13. Seidman's first business was as a teenager detailing automobiles, including those of R&B singer Lionel Richie whose cars he cleaned every Saturday. Seidman is dyslexic; his dyslexia is the subject of a case study in the book The Dyslexic Advantage.

Seidman attended UCLA for both bachelor's and master's degrees in philosophy, graduating summa cum laude in 1987. He then received another bachelor's degree from Oxford University in philosophy, politics and economics, where he was a Newton-Tatum scholar and served as captain of the Balliol College crew team. Following Oxford, he attended Harvard Law School, graduating in 1992.

== Career ==
=== 1992–present: LRN ===
While working in a preclerkship at the law firm O'Melveny & Myers and left in December 1992, whilst there Seidman developed the idea for a company to provide research and analysis from legal experts. Subsequently, borrowing money from friends and using credit cards, he launched the Legal Research Network (LRN) in 1994, to offer outsourced legal research and analysis to corporate law departments and law firms. He raised $2 million from 42 investors. By the end of 1999, LRN became involved in compliance training by offering a software as a service-based ethics and compliance education platform.

Seidman testified before the U.S. Sentencing Commission in 2004 about the need for companies to develop ethical cultures instead of 'check-the-box', compliance-only approaches, and his testimony helped shape the amendments to the Federal Sentencing Guidelines. He was hired by the NFL commissioner in 2014 to advocate to its owners and head coaches the need for the NFL to create a culture where tolerance and respect were normal expectations. In 2016, he spoke about issues concerning global leadership at a Fortune Magazine conference for 100 CEOs held in Vatican City.

Seidman also had LRN analyze corporate cultures and write codes of conduct. In 2016, Seidman negotiated a partnership between LRN and professional services firm PwC, which allowed LRN to expand their business with PwC clients; this lasted two years and represented up to 8% of LRN's revenue at the time. PwC reached a settlement with LRN; using this settlement money, LRN offered to purchase shares as an accommodation to some shareholders who had asked to liquidate their holdings. Ultimately approximately half of shareholders agreed and the company bought out a quarter of its shares, giving Seidman a larger share of ownership in the company. In 2018, Seidman oversaw an investment of an undisclosed amount from New York-based private equity firm Leeds Equity Partners into LRN. The following year, Seidman, LRN, and two other board members were sued by a former shareholder for breach of their fiduciary duties alleging that shareholders were encouraged to sell their shares at an unfairly low price in 2017 and were not given information regarding a potential transaction. In 2021, Seidman and the two other board members sued the lead plaintiff in the shareholders' lawsuit for defamation. In 2024, a Delaware court ruled that they had indeed made defamatory claims in the lawsuit. A settlement was reached in which the three board members received $18 million and the original lawsuit was dismissed, with its lead plaintiff repudiating its claims.

=== 2020–present: The HOW Institute for Society ===
Seidman founded The HOW Institute for Society, a non-profit focused on moral leadership, and was also its chairman.

In 2022, Seidman became a Hauser Leader at the Harvard Kennedy School's Center for Public Leadership.

In 2024 Seidman and The HOW Institute for Society released the results of a survey concluding that moral leadership in business was in decline while demand for good behavior grew.

== Publications ==
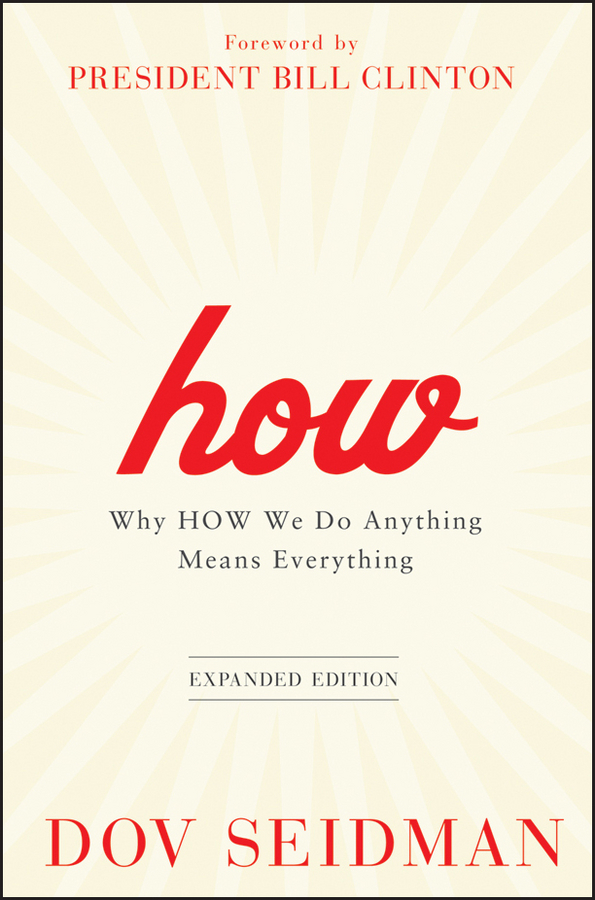
US book cover

Seidman wrote a book, How: Why How We Do Anything Means Everything... in Business (and in Life) published in September 2007. In 2011, How: Why How We Do Anything Means Everything, an expanded edition, was published. and became a New York Times Best Seller in the "Advice, How-to, and Miscellaneous" category.

Seidman is a columnist for DealBook in The New York Times, The Wall Street Journal, Forbes, and The Huffington Post.

== Legal disputes ==
Seidman sued yogurt maker Chobani and its advertising agency Droga5 in 2014 claiming that an advertising campaign run that same year around the theme "How Matters" violated trademarks legally held by Seidman. In 2017, Seidman settled the lawsuit out of court after Chobani withdrew its application for a trademark for "How Matters."

In March 2016, Seidman and LRN filed a lawsuit for breach of fiduciary duty against William Morris Endeavor Entertainment, his agent for the book, How. In 2017, Seidman and LRN settled all three lawsuits.

== Awards and honors ==
Seidman gave the commencement address at UCLA College of Letters and Science in 2002. He was given the Jurisprudence Award by the Anti-Defamation League in 2003. Since 2008, Seidman and LRN have been the corporate partner of The Elie Wiesel Foundation for Humanity's Prize in Ethics Essay Contest. In 2009, Seidman was awarded an honorary degree of Doctor of Human Letters by the Hebrew Union College Jewish Institute of Religion. Seidman was a keynote address speaker at the United Nations Global Compact in 2015. Seidman was a commencement speaker for the University of Miami School of Law in 2025.
