= Bruce Jacob =

American lawyer

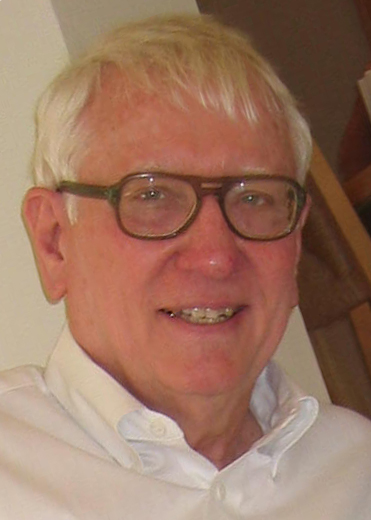

Assistant Attorney General of Florida

Personal details
- Born: Bruce Robert Jacob; 26 March 1935 (age 91) Chicago, Illinois
- Party: Democratic
- Profession: Lawyer, Law Professor and Dean

Bruce Robert Jacob (born March 26, 1935) is a former Assistant Attorney General for the State of Florida during the early 1960s. He represented Louie L. Wainwright, the Director of the Florida Division of Corrections, in the Supreme Court case of Gideon v. Wainwright, decided in March 1963, regarding the right to counsel of indigent defendants in non-capital felony cases in state courts. The attorney representing the Petitioner, Clarence Gideon, was Abe Fortas, a Washington, D.C. lawyer who later became a Justice of the Supreme Court. The previous 1942 Supreme Court case of Betts v. Brady required the appointment of counsel for an indigent defendant at state expense if there was a “special circumstance” present in the case which made it necessary for counsel to be provided for the defendant to receive a fair trial. For example, if the defendant was indigent and was extremely young, or lacked education or experience, was unfamiliar with court procedures, or if the charges against him were complex, the trial court was required under the Due Process Clause of the Fourteenth Amendment to appoint counsel. Jacob argued against any extension of the defendant's right to counsel. The Court in Gideon overruled Betts and required state courts to appoint attorneys for defendants in all felony prosecutions.

Gideon had been convicted of breaking the Bay Harbor Poolroom, located in the small community of Bay Harbor, near Panama City, Florida. His conviction was set aside and the case was sent back to the trial court in Panama City for a new trial. At the second trial, he was represented by appointed attorney Fred Turner and Gideon was acquitted.

The decision in Gideon led to the establishment of many more public defender offices throughout the United States than had existed previously. Anthony Lewis wrote a book about the case, entitled "Gideon’s Trumpet", published in 1964. In 1980 it was made into a movie of the same name, starring Henry Fonda as Clarence Gideon.

== Early life ==
Bruce Jacob was born in Chicago, Illinois, on March 26, 1935, and was raised in Hinsdale, Illinois, a suburb of Chicago. He and his family moved to Sarasota, Florida, when he was 16 and he graduated from Sarasota High School in 1953. During his senior year, he played the violin in the Florida West Coast Symphony. Also, he participated in football, basketball, and track, and in track was the 1953 Florida high school state champion in the half-mile run.

== College and legal education ==
For his first year of college, he attended Principia College, in Elsah, Illinois, and there he lettered in basketball and track. Beginning his second year he transferred to Florida State University, where he lettered in track. Also, he played in the Florida State Symphony orchestra and became a member of the Sigma Chi fraternity. He received a B.A. degree from Florida State in 1957. He studied law at Stetson University College of Law, St. Petersburg, Florida, and received the J.D. degree in 1959. At Stetson, during his senior year, he was the president of the student body.

Later, during his career as a lawyer, law professor, and dean, he received an LL.M (Criminal Law) degree from Northwestern University in 1965; the S.J.D. degree from Harvard Law School in 1980; and an LL.M (Taxation) from the University of Florida in 1995.

== Legal career ==
Jacob began his legal career in the Florida Attorney General’s office, in Tallahassee, in 1960 and there he represented the state in 19 appeals before the Florida Supreme Court and District Courts of Appeal of Florida. In 1962 he joined the firm of Holland, Bevis, and Smith, in Bartow and Lakeland Florida as an associate. (That firm now is Holland and Knight, in various cities in the United States and other countries). From 1965 to 1969 Jacob was an Assistant and associate professor at the Emory University School of Law, in Atlanta, Georgia. As a graduate student at the Harvard Law School, from 1968 to 1971 he served as a research associate in the Center for Criminal Justice and as a staff attorney in the Community Legal Assistance Office, a Harvard legal services office in Cambridge, Massachusetts.

Jacob subsequently was associate professor, then Professor, and Director of Clinical Programs at the Ohio State University College of Law in Columbus, Ohio from 1971 to 1978. From 1978 to 1981 he was Dean and Professor of Law of the Mercer University School of Law, in Macon, Georgia. From 1981 to 1994 he was Vice President of Stetson University and Dean and Professor at the Stetson College of Law. From 1994, when he stepped down as Dean, until he retired in 2018, he was a professor of law at Stetson. Jacob presently is Dean Emeritus and Professor Emeritus of the Stetson University College of Law.

In 2009 Jacob assisted in teaching a course on International Organizations in Lucerne and Geneva, Switzerland. In 2010 he was a panelist in American law at the Northwest University of Politics and Law, Xi’an, China; Southwest University of Political Science and Law, Chongqing, China; Dalian Maritime University, Dalian City, Manchuria, China; and Tsinghua University, Beijing. In 2011 he was an instructor in the Program on American Law, sponsored by the Northwest University of Politics and Law, in Xi’an, China.

== Legal work for indigent defendants and prison inmates ==
To comply with the Gideon decision, in May 1963, the Florida Legislature enacted a law creating a statewide public defender system and included was a provision allowing lawyers in private firms to become unpaid Special Assistant Public Defenders. Jacob, who by then was in private practice in Bartow, Florida, volunteered and was appointed to represent defendants in criminal cases under this statute.

In 1966, as assistant professor at Emory Law School, he established the Legal Assistance for Inmates (L.A.I.) The program, providing free legal help to indigent prisoners at the United States Penitentiary in Atlanta. While acting as the director and supervisor of the students in that program he was appointed by the United States Supreme Court as counsel for the Petitioner in the case of Kaufman v. United States. The Supreme Court ruled with Jacob, who argued that his client had been subjected to an unreasonable search and seizure under the Fourth Amendment to the Constitution. A movie was made, in 1986, about Harold Kaufman following his release from prison. Its title is “A Deadly Business” and it starred Alan Arkin as Kaufman.

Jacob also represented inmates in appellate cases such as Rosa v United States, and in federal trial-level cases such as White v Blackwell and Lawrence v Blackwell challenging prison rules and practices on constitutional grounds. The Emory program and the National Defender Project entered into an experiment in which two jailhouse lawyers from the Atlanta Penitentiary who were knowledgeable about federal criminal law were released from confinement to assist in the work of the program. The National Defense Project, through Deputy Director John Cleary, obtained the release of the two jailhouse lawyers and provided the funding to pay their salaries. They worked with students at the law school. One of these men, Benjamin Rayborn, later served for over 30 years as a highly respected paralegal at the office of the Federal Defender in San Diego, California.

While a graduate student at the Harvard Law School Jacob was the co-founder of the Prison Legal Assistance Project (P.L.A.P.), for Massachusetts prison inmates. This project was patterned after the Emory L.A.I. Program. Also, he was a staff attorney, supervising students at the Community Legal Assistance Office (C.L.A.O.), a legal service office operated by the Harvard Law School.

From 1971 to 1978, at The Ohio State University College of Law, he developed clinical programs and taught two of them – the Criminal Defense Clinic and the Criminal Appeals and Post-Conviction Remedies clinic. In these clinics, students represented indigent defendants and inmates under the supervision of Jacob and supervising attorneys.

While Dean and Professor at Mercer Law School and Stetson College of Law until he retired from Stetson, Jacob continued to provide legal help to indigent defendants and prison inmates.

While Dean at Stetson College of Law, Jacob resisted the desire of the faculty to take action against a professor who had declared that "he would not vote to hire any Anglo/white males until the gender, ethnic, and racial makeup of the faculty mirrored the representation of these groups in Florida."

== Honors and awards ==
In 2006 the members of an American Inn of Court in Tampa honored Professor Jacob by naming their Inn the "Bruce R. Jacob Criminal Appellate American Inn of Court." In 2016 the name became "Bruce R. Jacob - Chris W. Altenbernd Criminal Appellate Inn of Court." He was a member of The Constitution Project's "Blue Ribbon Panel" on indigent defense in the United States. In 2009 the panel issued its report, entitled "Justice Denied: America's Continuing Neglect of Our Constitutional Right to Counsel." In 2013 he was one of four persons presented with "Constitutional Champion" awards by the Constitution Project, in Washington, D.C. He received the 2013 "Champion of Indigent Defense Award" from the National Association of Criminal Defense Lawyers. Also, in 2013 he received the Delano Stewart Award from the George Edgecomb Bar Association, Tampa, and the "Power 100 Award" from the organization, "On Being a Black Lawyer" of Washington, D.C. These two awards were for efforts in making the legal profession more diverse. In 2014 he received the “Wm. Reece Smith, Jr. Public Service Award” from Stetson and the “Gardner W. Beckett, Jr. Civil Liberties Award” from the Pinellas County, Florida chapter of the A.C.L.U. He received the 2018 “Law Faculty Professionalism Award” from The Florida Bar.

He was honored by the Stetson faculty when in 2009 Stetson began hiring entry-level Visiting Assistant Professors who are known as "Bruce R. Jacob Fellows." They spend two years at Stetson, developing courses, teaching, and writing in preparation for a career as a law professor. He gave the commencement speech address for the College of Law in May 2019, and received the honorary LL.D degree from Stetson University.

In 2014 the Illinois Public Defender Association created an award to be given to outstanding Illinois public defenders and named it the “Bruce Robert Jacob Award.” At a semi-annual meeting of the Association in October 2019 in Springfield, Illinois, Jacob was given this award.

== Writings ==
Jacob has authored or co-othered 20 law review articles, book reviews, and a blog. Here are some of his writings:

- "The Gideon Case: Inside the Supreme Court's Historic Right to Counsel Decision", University Press of Florida (2026).
- “Memories of and ReflectionsAbout Gideon v Wainwright”, 33 Stetson Law Review 181 (2003).
- “Judges at Nuremberg:Stetson’s Connection to the War Crime Trials,” 44 Stetson Law Review 695 (2015)
- “The GideonTrials,” 99 Iowa Law Review 2059 (July 2014).
- “Remembering a Great Dean: Harold L. ‘Tom’ Sebring,” 30 Stetson Law Review 71 (2000).
- Co-author (with K.M. Sharma) of “Justice After Trial: Prisoners Need for Legal Services,” 18 Kansas Law Review 493 (1970).
- “Prison Discipline and Inmate Rights,” 5 Harvard Civil Rights-Civil Liberties Law Review 227 (1970)
- Blog – “Thoughts on Seila Law v The Consumers Finance Protection Bureau: Limitations on the Power of the President,”Brucerjacob.wordpress.com.

== Military service ==
In 1959 and 1960 Jacob spent six months on active duty in the U.S. Army at Ft. Jackson, South Carolina, for basic training, clerk-typist school, and work as a clerk typist and court reporter for special court-martial proceedings. He graduated and was commissioned a second lieutenant, infantry, from the officers' candidate school of the Florida National Guard, Camp Blanding, Florida in 1962. Subsequently, he transferred to the Judge Advocate General's Corps of the U.S. Army Reserve. In 1971 he resigned from the Army Reserve with the rank of captain.
