= Public defender (United States) =

Lawyer appointed for defendants who cannot afford one

In the United States, a public defender is a lawyer appointed by the courts and provided by the state or federal governments to represent and advise those charged with a crime or crimes who cannot afford to hire a private attorney. Public defenders are full-time attorneys employed by the state or federal governments. The public defender system is one of several types of criminal legal aid, the most common other system being appointed private counsel paid for by the government.

== Background and history ==
The Sixth Amendment reads:

In all criminal prosecutions, the accused shall enjoy the right to a speedy and public trial, by an impartial jury of the state and district wherein the crime shall have been committed, which district shall have been previously ascertained by law, and to be informed of the nature and cause of the accusation; to be confronted with the witnesses against him; to have compulsory process for obtaining witnesses in his favor, and to have the assistance of counsel for his defense.

One of the listed rights granted and guaranteed by the Sixth Amendment is the right to counsel; the right for defendants, who are on trial for criminal charges, to have legal aid in federal courts. The Sixth Amendment's right to counsel is for criminal cases only; it is not for civil cases or charges that do not carry a risk of imprisonment. Initially, this right to counsel referred to a right to bring a private lawyer of the defendant's choice to court, if they had retained one; it did not obligate the government to provide an attorney to a criminal defendant. The Supreme Court's interpretation of the right expanded the right over time in some ways, including that one.

=== Supreme Court rulings ===
==== Powell v. Alabama, 287 U.S. 45 (1932) ====
In 1931 in Scottsboro, Alabama, nine black youths, the "Scottsboro Boys", were placed on trial after two young white women claimed they were raped by the young black men. The day of their trial, the "Scottsboro Boys" were not appointed counsel by the judge and were instead represented by two unqualified people: a real estate agent from Tennessee and an old attorney who had not practiced law in many years. Both legal representatives of the "Scottsboro Boys" had very little information and knowledge about the situation but did not attempt to push back the trial. Every "Scottsboro Boy", except for one, was sentenced to death despite the fact the doctors who checked the two young women did not find any proof of rape.

The case was appealed but reaffirmed by the state supreme court and then appealed again. The case eventually climbed to and caught the eyes and attention of the Supreme Court of the United States in 1932. In a 7–2 vote, the Supreme Court overruled the conviction of the "Scottsboro Boys", stating that trial denied the due process and the equal protection clauses granted by the Fourteenth Amendment to the nine men by denying them the right to counsel granted by the Sixth Amendment.

The Supreme Court also ruled that, under the Fourteenth Amendment, the federal and state governments are to give legal counsel for capital crimes, crimes that can result in the death penalty, if the defendant is unable to afford their own private attorneys. This ruling expanded the interpretation of the Sixth Amendment and applied the rights of the Sixth Amendment to the states, not just the federal government, as well.

==== Betts v. Brady, 316 U.S. 455 (1942) ====
The Betts v. Brady case narrowed the interpretation and the understanding that came about from the Powell v. Alabama case. In 1941, a 43-year-old man by the name of Betts was arrested for stealing in the state of Maryland. Betts requested for an attorney, as he lacked the means to do so himself, but his request was denied by the court on the grounds that appointments were only granted to those on trial for capital crimes forcing him to represent himself. Betts was found guilty but attempted to appeal, arguing that the courts refusal to give him an attorney violated rights granted to him in the Fifth and Sixth Amendment such as the right to counsel. He argued that the court's refusal to grant him an attorney was in direct violation to the Supreme Court's decision from Powell v. Alabama.

The Supreme Court, by a 6–3 decision, supported Betts's conviction, sustained the ruling by the lower courts. Associate Justice Owen Roberts, the writer of the Supreme Court's opinion on this case, stated that the precedent set from Powell v. Alabama of appointing legal counsel was not set in stone due to the fact that there are different scenarios where something can appear to be unfair in one situation but not in another. He argued that in Powell v. Alabama, the legal counsel was necessary because the trial itself was prejudiced. Roberts also stated that the concept of appointing counsel was not required for every case by the states. The Court argued that the right to counsel was not one of the fundamental rights protected by the Constitution and the Bill of Rights. Ultimately, this ruling would allow the States freedom to decide when to grant the indigent defender legal counsel. The implications of the Supreme Court's decision of this case would last until the Supreme Court case Gideon v. Wainwright in 1963.

==== Gideon v. Wainwright, 372 U.S. 335 (1963) ====
The case Gideon v. Wainwright was a landmark case that would set the precedent on how legal counsel would work in the United States. In 1961, a burglary occurred in a poolroom in Florida and a man named Clarence Earl Gideon was arrested by the police on the basis of an eyewitness's testimony. Gideon requested legal counsel as he was unable to afford a lawyer; at the time, Florida only allowed appointed counsel for capital crimes, not lesser crimes like breaking and entering, and thus his request was denied. Florida's system was brought about by the previous Supreme Court Case Betts v. Brady, which allowed states to decide on their own when to offer indigent defense. Gideon was forced to defend himself; despite his hard work, he ended up being sentenced to prison for five years.

Gideon petitioned the Supreme Court on the grounds that he was not provided counsel and thus was denied him of his rights granted by the Fifth and Sixth Amendments of the United States Constitution and therefore, he was imprisoned on unconstitutional grounds. The Supreme Court unanimously ruled that the denial of Gideon's request for a lawyer was unconstitutional and that the Sixth Amendment grants the defendant the right to an attorney even if the defendant is unable to pay for one. The Courts ruled that states were required to provide lawyers on the grounds that having lawyers to defend defendants was a necessity. Justice Black, the writer of the Court's opinion, stated:

Even the intelligent and educated layman has small and sometimes no skill in the science of law. If charged with crime, he is incapable, generally, of determining for himself whether the indictment is good or bad. He is unfamiliar with the rules of evidence. Left without the aid of counsel, he may be put on trial without a proper charge, and convicted upon incompetent evidence, or evidence irrelevant to the issue or otherwise inadmissible. He lacks both the skill and knowledge adequately to prepare his defense, even though he have a perfect one. He requires the guiding hand of counsel at every step in the proceedings against him. Without it, though he be not guilty, he faces the danger of conviction because he does not know how to establish his innocence.

Justice Black, in keeping with the Court’s decision in Powell v. Alabama, opined that the guiding hand of counsel can prevent an innocent man from being imprisoned falsely. From this point on, all defendants on trial for criminal charges were guaranteed the right to a lawyer, no matter what their financial situation looks like. The Court's decision in this case overturned the previous understanding of legal counsel set by the Court in Betts v. Brady. Gideon v. Wainwright would be the catalyst for the wave of change in criminal justice that the 1950s and 1960s would experience.

==== Strickland v. Washington, 466 U.S. 668 (1984) ====
The Supreme Court case Strickland v. Washington changed the way people interpret the Sixth Amendment by stating that the legal counsel provided to defendants should be reasonably effective. Strickland was placed on trial for murder charges in the state of Florida and was sentenced to death. Strickland appealed to the Supreme Court on the grounds that his counsel did not fulfill his duty on grounds such as not seeking a psychiatric exam despite the fact Strickland pleaded emotional issues. The Supreme Court ruled 8–1 that effective legal counsel is a right but in order to prove the counsel is ineffective, the defendant needs to prove (1) their lawyer's performance was below a certain standard and (2) there is a chance that if it was not for the ineffectiveness, a different result could have occurred.

=== Inception of the public defender ===
There had been some provisions for legal counsel for the indigent population prior to Gideon. California's first female attorney, Clara Shortridge Foltz (1849–1934), came up with the idea of the public defender. Foltz was growing concerned with the prosecutors in court, feeling that they served themselves, and believed in the creation of a rival that would mirror the prosecutor, just as qualified but instead of searching for guilt, searching for innocence. Foltz was also inspired by the people she represented in court such as Charles Colby who lamented over spending all that he owned on ineffective legal counsel. She proposed this, at the time, radical idea of the public defender system at the 1893 Chicago World's Fair as well as wrote numerous law articles on the reasoning why the costs of the criminal defendant should be shouldered by the government. One memorable quote from her speech at the Chicago World fair was:

For the conviction of the accused every weapon is provided and used, even those poisoned by wrong and injustice. But what machinery is provided for the defense of the innocent? None, absolutely none.

Despite the fact that provisions for indigent legal defense did exist before the creation of the public defender program, Foltz argued the lawyers appointed were unqualified in comparison to the public prosecutors. In fact, she believed that the public defender should be created as a mirror to the public prosecutor; she wished for the selection and the salary to be the same. Her goal of seeing this idea come to fruition saw success when the state of California would see the first public defender office of the United States open in the city of Los Angeles in 1913. Following the creation of the Los Angeles Public Defender office, the public defender program and idea spread throughout the nation.

Gideon served as the catalyst for expansion of public defender programs. Following the landmark 1963 decision, the 1960s witnessed the creation of programs across the country to make this right to counsel available to most people charged with crimes who could not afford an attorney to represent them.

=== Alternate indigent defense systems ===
The public defender system is not the only form of indigent defense program offered in the United States. Besides the public defender system, there are two other main alternatives: assigned-counsel system and contract-service system. Assigned-counsel is where the court appoints a private lawyer to defend someone who cannot afford to pay. Contract-service is where an attorney is contracted to work for a period of time. These three forms are usually mixed and matched together in different ways in different states. For instance, most states usually use both assigned-counsel and the public defender program side by side. Assigned counsel is usually used when the public defender program is overexerted in the number of cases they have to process or if there is a legal issue of conflict of interest in a case.

== State systems ==
In some US states, the office is not titled as "Public Defender"; for example, Kentucky's public defender office is called the Department of Public Advocacy.

=== Structure ===
Public defender agencies of all kinds are supported by public funding, but are ethically bound to be independent and do not take direction from the government as to the acceptance or handling of cases, or to the hiring of staff attorneys. One of the most well established statewide public defender systems is in Wisconsin. The Wisconsin State Public Defender has been used as a model for other states and several countries. Wisconsin has a program that uses both staff attorneys and appointments to attorneys in private practice. State public defender systems can vary widely from state to state, county to county, and from federal defender organizations. Most chief public defenders are appointed. The chief public defenders in Florida, Tennessee, Lincoln, Nebraska, and San Francisco are elected.

The general trend is for larger metropolitan county governments to set up a government agency under an official with the title of public defender who hires full-time staff attorneys on regular salaries, while smaller suburban and rural counties continue to rely on the traditional system of appointing attorneys in private practice to satisfy their constitutional obligations under Gideon. Before major reforms were enacted in 2022, Maine was the last state with no public defenders whatsoever, in the strict sense of a government official with that title. Up to that point, indigent defendants in Maine had to rely exclusively upon private attorneys appointed under contract by the Maine Commission on Indigent Legal Services.

Defenders vary greatly regarding the types of support staff they employ to support the work of their attorneys. In addition to clerical staff, defender offices may employ investigators, social workers, and forensic experts, such as psychologists. These human resources may help defenders provide more professional service than an appointed lawyer without this type of staff or funds to employ them. Private appointed attorneys are entitled to apply to the court for the services of an expert or investigator and the government is required to pay for those services if they are essential to the defense of the accused person.

=== Pay ===
In jurisdictions where indigent defense is handled on the basis of contracts or ad-hoc appointments, there has been increasing concern about the low pay and minimal resources given to public defenders.

In jurisdictions where the public defender is a government agency, public defenders are generally on the same or similar pay-scale to prosecutors. This rate of pay is generally below that of the private sector. In jurisdictions without an organized public defender agency, some courts and legislatures in some states tend to "cap" the amount a panel attorney who does not work for a public defender receives.

=== Practice ===
Entry level public defenders can be hired straight out of their third year of law school. State public defenders and state prosecutors typically begin their careers handling criminal cases on the misdemeanor level and work closely with a supervising attorneys on their more complex cases.

Full-time state public defenders typically handle felony and misdemeanor criminal cases.

Many staff attorneys belong to unions. In Florida, staff attorneys have no civil service protections.

In US civil cases (e.g., personal injury or a landlord-tenant dispute), public defenders may be appointed in civil cases that are quasi-criminal in nature (e.g., removal of children from parents and civil commitments for alleged sexually violent predators) or in highly unusual situations where the civil proceedings may be highly connected to criminal proceedings; otherwise indigent litigants are referred to a legal aid office.

== Federal public defenders ==
=== Structure ===
Federal Public Defender offices follow one of two models. The first model, the Federal Public Defender, is a federal agency which operates under the Judicial Branch of the federal government, specifically administered by the Administrative Office of the United States Courts. However, they perform administrative and budgetary duties as only the circuit courts of appeals of the United States are in charge of appointing their respective Federal Defenders, who in turn hire lawyers and support staff and manage the office. This model is followed separately for each individual judicial district in their circuit. The procedures for appointment, re-appointment and other administrative matters vary from circuit to circuit but the Federal Public Defender is appointed for a four-year term. The second model is that of the community defender. Although similar to a federal public defender, technically it is actually a corporation that receives federal grant money and acts more independently from the federal judiciary. Although both type of defender offices are supported by public funding, they do not take direction from the government as to the operation of the offices.

Federal Public Defender offices are customarily located in larger metropolitan areas, but serve clients throughout their assigned area.

=== Practice ===
The Office of the Federal Public Defender operates under authority of the Criminal Justice Act of 1964 (CJA),18 U.S.C. § 3006A. It provides defense services in federal criminal cases to individuals who are financially unable to obtain adequate representation. A person's eligibility for defender services is determined by the federal court. Defender organization attorneys may not engage in the private practice of law. Those accused who are found to be indigent in jurisdictions without a Federal or Community Defender, and those for whom there is a conflict or those charged at a time the Defender in their jurisdiction is short staffed or has a full caseload, will be appointed private counsel who are paid an hourly rate from an approved list of qualified lawyers who have the requisite experience to handle a federal criminal case.

A federal defender's case load is usually substantially lower than her or his state counterpart's. While a state public defender may have to juggle over one hundred cases, an Assistant Federal Public Defender routinely has 30-50 cases, though the severity and complexity of such cases may be greater. The federal system has over 4,000 separate offenses, and uses a very mechanistic, sentencing scheme based on a set of "advisory" sentencing guidelines.

=== Pay ===
By law, lawyers employed by Federal Public Defender offices have salaries set to match those of lawyers in the U.S. Attorney's office. The combination of salary, benefits and support team tends to attract, and more importantly retain, highly qualified attorneys. Especially in more rural areas, where federal criminal work is considered well-paid, many federal defenders have risen up through the state systems before becoming federal defenders.

== Legal issues ==
=== Conflict of interest ===
Because conflict of interest problems could exist where multiple defendants participated in a single crime, only one person in a group of co-defendants will be assigned an attorney from a public defender office. For many defendants, it is in their best interest to testify against co-defendants in exchange for a reduced sentence. To ensure that each defendant is afforded their constitutional right to an effective defense, jurisdictions may have several public defender entities, or a "conflict panel" of private practice attorneys. This enables the court to assign each defendant an attorney from a completely separate office, thereby guarding against the risk of one client's privileged information accidentally falling into the hands of another client's attorney. Some jurisdictions, like in Los Angeles County, employ a separate entity for legal representation called the Alternate Public Defender's office. Any further conflicts are handled by court-appointed private attorneys.

=== Appeals ===
Notably, the landmark Gideon case only gives an indigent criminal defendant a right to be represented at trial and upon the first appeal of right. But the Supreme Court has held that there is no right to representation for discretionary appeals or post-conviction collateral attacks like habeas corpus and coram nobis. In other words, an indigent convicted criminal who loses his trial, and first appeal of right, is on his own afterwards. (At least one state, Virginia, did not even allow an appeal of right until a change of law took effect in 2022. (Note: 2021 Senate Bill 1261, which also expanded the Virginia Court of Appeals to hear the influx of new cases, now grants an appeal of right in both civil and criminal cases.))

Upon review of the trial court record, an appellate public defender may conclude there are no reasonable or valid grounds for an appeal. Such a conclusion creates a conflict between the duty to diligently represent the client (and honor their right to a first appeal), and the duty to the court to refrain from filing frivolous appeals. In 2000, the U.S. Supreme Court upheld as constitutional the so-called Wende appellate procedure implemented by California to resolve this dilemma. The appellate public defender files an opening brief summarizing the procedural and factual history of the case, indicates that he has explained his evaluation of the case to his client and told the client of his right to file a pro se supplemental brief, asks that the court independently examine the record for arguable issues, and expresses his availability to argue any issues on which the court desires briefing. However, the appellate brief never expressly indicates that the appeal is frivolous, though the implicit message is obvious. The California Court of Appeal then undertakes its own review of the record. If it finds a possible issue, it directs the parties to brief and argue it. If it finds none, it issues an opinion (usually unpublished) affirming the conviction.

== Controversy and ethical issues ==
The public defender office and position is not without controversy. One of the longest-running controversies arises from those questioning why the government should fund and support the legal defense of those whom they are putting on trial to begin with. In fact, this controversy dates back to 1897: The New-York Tribune found it "a ridiculous thing for the State to prosecute with one hand and defend with the other the violation of its own statutes".

It has been widely noted since the appointment of the first public defenders that many criminal defendants hold strongly negative opinions of public defenders. In 1970, political science professor Jonathan D. Casper launched the first formal study of this phenomenon by interviewing Connecticut criminal defendants, and similar studies were carried out elsewhere during the 1970s. From such research, three major themes can be discerned. First, defendants distrust public defenders because they recognize the conflict of interest noted above, in that the public defender is being paid by the very same government that is prosecuting them. Second, defendants view public defenders as an integrated part of the criminal justice system. The defendants see the public defenders, prosecutors, and judges as all assembled together in the same courthouse almost every day, frantically fighting over whether one case after another should be plea bargained, tried, or dismissed, and seeing the defendants only as a series of faces shuffling through en route to prison. Thus, defendants believe that public defenders have an incentive to help prosecutors to secure convictions in the hope of eventually getting jobs with the prosecutor's office. Third, defendants perceive the work of private criminal defense attorneys to be inherently more valuable because there is a buyer decision process involved, in the sense that a client who makes conscious decisions to shop for, select, hire, and pay a private attorney can exert more control over the attorney-client relationship than an indigent defendant for whom the court must appoint a public defender.

A "classic statement" of defendants' attitudes towards public defenders can be seen in the title of an early 1971 report on Casper's research: "Did You Have a Lawyer When You Went to Court? No, I Had a Public Defender". "Dump truck" and "public pretender" are terms sometimes used by defendants when complaining about their public defender. The California Court of Appeal for the Fourth Appellate District, Division Two explained in a 1977 opinion:

For the benefit of the uninitiated, 'dump truck' is a term commonly used by criminal defendants when complaining about the public defender. The origins of the phrase are somewhat obscure. However, it probably means that in the eyes of the defendant the public defender is simply trying to dump him rather than afford him a vigorous defense. It is an odd phenomenon familiar to all trial judges who handle arraignment calendars that some criminal defendants have a deep distrust for the public defender. This erupts from time to time in savage abuse to these long-suffering but dedicated lawyers. It is almost a truism that a criminal defendant would rather have the most inept private counsel than the most skilled and capable public defender. Often the arraigning judge appoints the public defender only to watch in silent horror as the defendant's family, having hocked the family jewels, hire a lawyer for him, sometimes a marginal misfit ...

The number of public defenders, their salary and other issues related to public defenders have been controversial. Eric Holder, the United States Attorney General in 2013, phrased the current issues of the public defender system as a state of crisis and saw the current system as a failure to uphold the Sixth Amendment as well as Gideon. The public defenders, especially the State appointed ones, have to deal with numerous issues with respect to excessive caseloads and low salaries. In particular, low salaries can discourage or fail to attract the best legal talent and can also lead to problems retaining experienced attorneys. A good example of such an issue is when Louisiana public defenders were so underfunded, had such a large shortage, and had a huge excessive workload that the office was forced to put defendants in need of a public defender on a waiting list. One example of public awareness of these issues is the film Lethal Weapon 4, which features a humorous version of the Miranda warning in which the humor comes at public defenders' expense.

Excessive workload appears to be an issue as well. According to a study by the Bureau of Justice Statistics, 73% of the county offices in the United States went over the recommended maximum limit of cases. In Missouri, a study reported that the state required 270 more public defenders just to represent the indigent at a barely acceptable manner.

Another issue that arises from the lower numbers of public defenders is that the government is forced to rely on alternatives to the public defender system such as private lawyers appointed by the courts. In federal courts, 75 percent of the defendants rely on appointed lawyers especially when the public defender offices have issues with conflict of interest which can be caused by public defender shortages. From studies such as the Rand study, the court appointed private lawyers usually result in higher prison rates as well as higher prison time compared to that of the public defenders. For instance, studies showed that court appointed lawyers had clients with imprisonment times eight months longer, on average, to the clients who had public defenders. The controversy arises from results of Supreme Court Cases such as Strickland v. Washington as some question if the legal counsel provided is effective as the Supreme Court argued effective counsel was guaranteed by the Sixth Amendment. The question also arises, in this scenario, if this is even ethical. Ethical issues in these terms have become so problematic that the United States Department of Justice was forced to research on constitutional violations in representation.

Controversy also exists over the idea of representing the guilty. Mayer Goldman, an early 20th century proponent of the position, questioned what should happen if a public defender represents a guilty defendant. In fact, Harvard Law School's Guide for Careers in Indigent Defense, emphasizes the importance of having to get over the emotion and frustration of having to defend the guilty.

Disagreement in the federal appellate courts has arisen over the issue of whether a defendant's sentence may be increased because they lied in order to become eligible for a court-appointed attorney.

== See also ==
- Assistance of Counsel Clause
- Legal aid in the United States
- Public Defender Service for the District of Columbia
- Right to counsel
- Sixth Amendment to the United States Constitution
