= W. Fred Turner =

American attorney

- Born: April 17, 1922; Millville, Florida
- Died: November 23, 2003 (aged 81); Panama City, Florida
- Education: University of Florida
- Known for: His successful criminal defense of Clarence Earl Gideon
- Spouse: Helen Turner

Winton Frederick Turner (April 17, 1922 – November 23, 2003) was an American attorney. He successfully defended Clarence Earl Gideon in his retrial after the 1963 Supreme Court case of Gideon v. Wainwright overturned his first conviction. The story behind this case was told in Anthony Lewis's 1964 book Gideon's Trumpet. There was also a 1980 made-for-TV film called Gideon's Trumpet in which Lane Smith played Turner and Henry Fonda played Gideon.

Turner was born in Millville, Florida, now part of Panama City. He joined the Army Air Corps, the precursor to the present-day Air Force, after high school and was a supply officer in the 308th Bombardment Group during World War II. He rose to the rank of captain before leaving for the University of Florida in Gainesville. After graduating in 1948, he returned to Bay County to practice law.

== Gideon's case ==
Clarence Earl Gideon was a drifter convicted of petty theft from a pool hall; at the trial he was denied a lawyer. His appeal to the Supreme Court was accepted, and the decision ordered that counsel be provided in all criminal cases. Gideon's conviction was not overturned, but he was to be tried again.

Gideon chose Turner to be his lawyer for his second trial. The retrial took place on August 5, 1963, five months after the Supreme Court ruling. By destroying the credibility of the prosecution's key witness through exposing contradictions with other eyewitnesses and the witness's self-admittedly false statements (such as about his prior criminal record), Turner won an acquittal for Gideon. The jury acquitted Gideon after one hour of deliberation.

== After Gideon ==
Turner worked as a private attorney until 1979, when he was appointed and subsequently elected to a circuit judge seat. He retired from the bench in 1991 at age 70. His wife Helen died in 1997. Turner died in 2003 at age 81 at his home in Panama City.

He was survived by three children and three grandchildren.
