= Millville, Florida =

Coordinates: 30°09′05″N 85°37′50″W

- Interactive map of Millville, Florida
- Country: United States
- State: Florida
- County: Bay
- Incorporated (town): None
- Incorporated (city): 1913-1920

Government
  - Mayor: Michael Rohan
  - Commissioner: Jenna Haligas
- Time zone: UTC-6 (Central (CST))
  - Summer (DST): UTC-5 (CDT)
- ZIP code: 32401
- Area code: 850

Millville is a community in Panama City, Florida, United States.

== History ==
Historical Millville, located directly off Highway 98, was one of the original frontier settlements in Bay County. The community rests between Watson Bayou and St. Andrews Bay. Rich in history, the area was built around the St. Andrews Lumber Company 's sawmill in the late 19th century. In 1913, Millville was incorporated and citizens elected W.I. Singletary as Millville's first mayor. By 1920, Millville was the largest community around the bay and the center of commerce and industry for the area. In 1926, Panama City annexed Millville into its incorporated city limits; however, it retains its unique historical character. Today, visitors can still view many historical buildings, including Sweet Magnolias Deli, located on historic East 3rd Street in downtown Millville.

== Waterfronts Florida ==
In 2009, Millville earned honor as a designated Waterfronts Florida community. Cities and communities are chosen for their unique working waterfronts and their dedication to revitalization.

== Public parks ==
Public spaces include Daffin Park and The C.M. Kidd Harris Park (established in 1934). In 2010, the growing community allocated $20,000 in funds for a waterfront park to be housed near the site of the community's original lumber mill. The project, which is expected to be completed by 2014, is expected to house a gazebo, a boardwalk, and public access to Watson's Bayou.

== Media ==
Author Ann Pratt Houpt documents Millville's history in her book, Millville Images of America, published in 2005 by Arcadia Publishing.

== Industry ==
Millville is home to a working waterfront, including an shipbuilding and marine repair industry and paper mill.

The papermill closed in 2022.

Millville is also home to Boyette and Casey Hardware, one of Bay County's oldest family owned businesses. In 1958, J.T. Boyette and Fred Casey purchased Millville Hardware Company. In 1992, Lee Casey purchased the company from his father, Fred, making it the third generation to take ownership of the company.

== Notable person ==
W. Fred Turner, was the lawyer who represented Clarence Earl Gideon in Gideon vs. Wainwright, a landmark case in United States Supreme Court History. Visitors to Millville can still view the house where Turner was raised.
