= Lane Smith =

American actor (1936–2005)

- Smith as Richard Nixon in The Final Days
- Born: Walter Lane Smith III; April 29, 1936; Memphis, Tennessee, U.S.
- Died: June 13, 2005 (aged 69); Los Angeles, California, U.S.
- Occupation: Actor
- Years active: 1966–2005
- Known for: Lois & Clark: The New Adventures of Superman
- Spouse(s): Sydnee MacCall (m. 1986; div. 1998) Debbie Benedict Smith (m. 2000)
- Children: 3

Walter Lane Smith III (April 29, 1936 – June 13, 2005) was an American actor. His well-known roles included newspaper editor Perry White in the ABC series Lois & Clark: The New Adventures of Superman, collaborator entrepreneur Nathan Bates in the 1984 NBC television series V, Mayor Bates in the film Red Dawn, Coach Jack Reilly in The Mighty Ducks, district attorney Jim Trotter in My Cousin Vinny, U.S. Congressman Dick Dodge in The Distinguished Gentleman, Grantland Rice in The Legend of Bagger Vance, and U.S. President Richard Nixon in The Final Days, for which he received a Golden Globe award nomination.

== Early life ==
Lane Smith was born in 1936 in Memphis, Tennessee. He graduated from the Leelanau School, a boarding school in Glen Arbor, Michigan, and spent one year boarding at the Hill School in Pottstown, Pennsylvania, before studying at the Actors Studio in the late 1950s and early 1960s along with Dustin Hoffman and Al Pacino; he was recognized in their Hall of Fame. Smith served two years in the U.S. Army.

== Career ==
After graduating, Smith found steady work in New York theater before making his film debut in Maidstone in 1970. During the 1970s, he regularly made appearances in small film roles including Rooster Cogburn in 1975 and Network in 1976. In 1981, Smith appeared in the Sidney Lumet-directed film Prince of the City. He also acted on television, notably playing a United States Marine in Vietnam in the television miniseries A Rumor of War and in the 1980 Hallmark Hall of Fame TV movie Gideon's Trumpet starring Henry Fonda, José Ferrer and John Houseman. Smith is also credited for playing McMurphy 650 times in the 1971 Off-Broadway revival of One Flew Over the Cuckoo's Nest.

Smith made a major breakthrough in 1984 with significant roles in Red Dawn, Places in the Heart and the television series V. He also played on Quincy, M.E. in season 8, episode 7, "Science for Sale" as an oncologist searching for a cure to cancer. In 1989, Smith gained recognition for his portrayal of Richard Nixon in the docudrama The Final Days. Newsweek praised the performance, writing, "[Smith] is such a good Nixon that his despair and sorrow at his predicament become simply overwhelming." Smith earned a Golden Globe nomination for his performance. He also appeared in the original Broadway stage production of David Mamet's Glengarry Glen Ross as James Lingk. He received a Drama Desk Award for his performance.

In 1990, Smith appeared in Air America playing a United States Senator, a role for which he was selected based on his resemblance to then-Minority Leader Bob Dole. Two years later, he played a powerful and corrupt United States Congressman opposite Eddie Murphy in The Distinguished Gentleman, followed by a role as a small-town district attorney opposite Joe Pesci in My Cousin Vinny, and as Coach Jack Reilly in The Mighty Ducks. In 1993, Smith played Walter Warner in Son in Law. That same year, he was cast as Perry White in Lois & Clark: The New Adventures of Superman, which he played for four seasons until 1997. In 1994, he portrayed New York Yankees front officeman Ron in The Scout, alongside Albert Brooks and Brendan Fraser. In 1998, Smith appeared in a major role as fictional television anchorman Emmett Seaborn in the HBO miniseries From the Earth to the Moon. His final film appearance was in The Legend of Bagger Vance (2000).

== Death ==
Smith was diagnosed with amyotrophic lateral sclerosis (ALS, and also known as Lou Gehrig's disease) in April 2004. He died of complications from the disease at home in the Northridge neighborhood of Los Angeles, California, on June 13, 2005 at the age of 69. He was survived by his wife, Debbie Benedict Smith, and his son Robert Smith.

== Filmography ==
=== Film ===
Film
Year	Title	Role	Notes
1966	Unholy Matrimony	Partygoer	Uncredited
1970	Maidstone		
1973	The Last American Hero	Rick Penny	
1973	Cops and Robbers	Perpetrator	
1974	Man on a Swing	Virginia De Leo	
1975	Rooster Cogburn	Leroy	
1975	Everybody Rides the Carousel		
1976	Network	Robert McDonough	
1977	Between the Lines	Roy Walsh	
1977	The Bad News Bears in Breaking Training	Officer Mackle	
1978	Blue Collar	Clarence Hill	
1978	On the Yard	Captain Blake	
1979	Over the Edge	Sloan	
1980	On the Nickel	Preacher	
1980	Honeysuckle Rose	Brag, Cotton's Manager	
1980	Resurrection	Don	
1981	Prince of the City	"Tug" Barnes	
1981	Soggy Bottom, U.S.A.	Jack "Smilin' Jack"	
1982	Frances	Dr. Symington	
1984	Purple Hearts	Commander Markel	
1984	Red Dawn	Mayor Bates	
1984	Places in the Heart	Albert Denby	
1986	Native Son	Britton	
1987	Weeds	Claude	
1987	Prison	Warden Ethan Sharpe	
1989	Race for Glory	Joe Gifford	
1989	Night Game	Witty	
1990	Air America	Senator Davenport	
1992	My Cousin Vinny	District Attorney Jim Trotter III	
1992	The Mighty Ducks	Coach Jack Reilly	
1992	The Distinguished Gentleman	Dick Dodge	
1993	Son in Law	Walter Warner	
1994	The Flight of the Dove	Stephen Hahn	
1994	The Scout	Ron Wilson	
1996	The War at Home	Majoree's Husband	Uncredited
1996	Why Do Fools Fall in Love	Ezra Grahme	
1996	The Hi-Lo Country	Steve Shaw	
1998	Getting Personal	Dr. Maddie	
2000	The Caprice	Thunderhead	
2000	The Legend of Bagger Vance	Grantland Rice	

=== Television ===
Television
Year	Title	Role	Notes
1975	Kojak	Clyde Regan	Season 2 Episode 18: "Queen of the Gypsies"
1975	Valley Forge	Spad	TV movie
1975–1979	The Rockford Files	(1) Willett (2) CIA Agent Donnegan	(1) Season 1 Episode 17: "Claire" (1975) (2) Season 5 Episode 13: "The Battle-Ax and the Exploding Cigar" (1979)
1977	The Displaced Person	Mr. Shortley	TV movie
1977	The Court-Martial of George Armstrong Custer		TV movie
1978	A Death in Canaan	Bob Hartman	TV movie
1978	Crash	Flight Engineer Romano	TV movie
1979	The Solitary Man	Jack Collins	TV movie
1979	Disaster on the Coastliner	John Carlson	TV movie
1980	City in Fear	Brian	TV movie
1980	Gideon's Trumpet	Fred Turner	TV movie
1980	A Rumor of War	Sergeant William Holgren	Miniseries; Season 1 Episode 1 Season 1 Episode 2
1980	The Georgia Peaches	Randolph Dukane	TV movie
1980	Mark, I Love You	Don Payer	TV movie
1981	Dallas	Prosecutor	Season 5 Episode 2: "Gone, But Not Forgotten"
1981	Dark Night of the Scarecrow	Harless Hocker	TV movie
1981	Hart to Hart	Roy Hamlin	Season 3 Episode 20: "Hart, Line, and Sinker"
1982	Prime Suspect	Tom Keating	TV movie
1982	Thou Shalt Not Kill	Clarence Blake	TV movie
1982	Lou Grant	Dr. Lawrence	Season 5 Episode 20: "Unthinkable"
1982	The Big Easy	Lieutenant Frank Medley	TV movie
1982	Quincy, M.E.	Dr. Paul Flynn	Season 8 Episode 7: "Science for Sale"
1982	Member of the Wedding	Mr. Addams	TV movie
1983	Special Bulletin	Morton Sanders	TV movie
1983	Chiefs	Hoss Spence	Miniseries; Season 1 Episode 1 Season 1 Episode 2 Season 1 Episode 3
1984	Something About Amelia	Officer Dealy	TV movie
1984–1985	V	Nathan Bates	13 episodes
1985	Hill Street Blues	Mike	Season 5 Episode 18: "El Capitan"
1985	Beverly Hills Cowgirl Blues	Captain Max Rosenberg	TV movie
1985	Bridge Across Time	Anson Whitfield	TV movie
1986	Amazing Stories	Dr. Caruso	Season 1 Episode 18: "Dorothy and Ben"
1986	The Twilight Zone	Professor Joseph Fitzgerald	Season 1 Episode 20 (Segment: "Profile in Silver")
1986	Dress Gray	Colonel King	Miniseries; Season 1 Episode 1 Season 1 Episode 2
1986	If Tomorrow Comes	Warden Brannigan	Miniseries; Season 1 Episode 1
1986	Alfred Hitchcock Presents	Robert Warren	Season 1 Episode 18: "Episode: Happy Birthday"
1986	Kay O'Brien	Doctor Robert Moffitt	13 episodes
1987	A Place to Call Home	Sam	TV movie
1988	In the Heat of the Night	Sonny Mims	Season 1 Episode 3: "Road Kill"
1988	Killer Instinct	Dr. Butler	TV movie
1989	Murder, She Wrote	Police Chief Underwood	Season 5 Episode 11: "The Search for Peter Kerry"
1989	The Final Days	Richard Nixon	TV movie Golden Globe Award (nominated)
1990	Challenger	Larry Mulloy	TV movie
1990	Blind Vengeance	Colonel Blanchard	TV movie
1991	Good Sports	R.J. Rappaport	21 episodes
1991	Good & Evil	Harlan Shell	5 episodes (1 uncredited)
1991	False Arrest	Martin Busey	TV movie
1992	Duplicates	Mr. Fryman	TV movie
1993–1997	Lois & Clark: The New Adventures of Superman	Perry White	84 episodes
1994	Murphy Brown	Danger Duke Robinson	Voice; Season 7 Episode 2: "Where Have You Gone, Joe DiMaggio?"
1995	Dweebs	Colonel Whitmore	Season 1 Episode 4: "The Cyrano Show"
1996	Clueless	Dan Hafner	Season 1 Episode 11: "Romeo & Cher"
1997	Alien Nation: The Udara Legacy	Senator Silverthorne	TV movie
1998	The Outer Limits	Dr. Malcolm Boussard	Season 4 Episode 9: "Glyphic"
1998	From the Earth to the Moon	Emmett Seaborn	(1) Season 1 Episode 1: "Can We Do This?" (2) Season 1 Episode 4: "1968" (3) Season 1 Episode 6: "Mare Tranquilitatis" (4) Season 1 Episode 7: "That's All There Is" (5) Season 1 Episode 8: "We Interrupt This Program" (6) Season 1 Episode 12: "Le voyage dans la lune"
1999	Walker, Texas Ranger	Reverend Thornton Powers	Season 7 Episode 21: "Power Angels"
1999	Inherit the Wind	Reverend Jeremiah Brown	TV movie
2000	King of the Hill	(1) and (2) Charlie Fortner (3) Nate Hashaway	Voice (1) Season 4 Episode 13: "Hanky Panky" (2) Season 4 Episode 20: "Meet the Propaniacs" (3) Season 4 Episode 22: "Flush with Power"
2001	Bull	Russell Dantly	Season 1 Episode 18: "Amen"
2001	DAG	Agent Baxter	Season 1 Episode 17: "The Triangle Report"
2001	WW3	John Sullivan	TV movie
2001	The Practice	Judge H. Finkel	Season 6 Episode 1: "The Candidate"
2002	Judging Amy	Mr. Radford	Season 4 Episode 10: "People of the Lie"
2003	Out of Order	Frank	Miniseries (all 6 episodes); final role
