= St. Andrews Bay Lumber Company =

Lumber mill in Florida, United States

The St. Andrews Bay Lumber Company was a lumber mill that operated in Bay County, Florida from 1898 to 1931, then one of the largest lumber operations in the United States.

== History ==
In 1898, Henry Bovis, a French Canadian immigrant and Bagdad, Florida resident, built a large sawmill known as St. Andrews Lumber Company at the head of Watson Bayou in Bay County, Florida sourcing wood from the forests surrounding St. Andrews Bay. The community surrounding the mill became known as Millville. In 1901, the mill was sold to a German company and renamed the German-American Lumber Company with ultimate ownership tied to the Emperor of Germany, Kaiser Wilhelm. By 1906, the company had 1,500 employees and over 75,000 acres of harvestable lumber becoming one of the largest lumber companies in the United States. After the onset of World War I, the company was seized by the U.S. Government under the Trading with the Enemy Act after pro-German literature and a secret gun emplacement were discovered. The government continued to run the mill as the American Lumber Company. During World War I, the government contracted with the mill to construct eight three-masted schooner barges utilizing the standard ship design 1001 under the United States Shipping Board's Emergency Fleet Corporation program but only one was completed before the war ended (SS Millville). In 1919, the mill was purchased for $1.25 million by Minor C. Keith of New York and sawmill owner Walter C. Sherman and it was renamed St. Andrews Bay Lumber Company. The mill operated until 1930 when it was closed after depleting most of the timber in the forests from where they sourced. The mill burned on March 22, 1931.
