= In re Gault =

- Supreme Court of the United States

Argued December 6, 1966 Decided May 15, 1967
- Full case name: In re Gault et al.
- Citations: 387 U.S. 1 (more) 87 S. Ct. 1428; 18 L. Ed. 2d 527; 1967 U.S. LEXIS 1478; 40 Ohio Op. 2d 378
- Argument: Oral argument

Case history
- Prior: Application of Gault; 99 Ariz. 181 (1965), Supreme Court of Arizona, Rehearing denied

Holding
- Juveniles tried for crimes in delinquency proceedings should have the right of due process protected by the Fifth Amendment, including the right to confront witnesses and the right to counsel guaranteed by the Sixth Amendment.

Court membership
- Chief Justice Earl Warren Associate Justices Hugo Black · William O. Douglas; Tom C. Clark · John M. Harlan II; William J. Brennan Jr. · Potter Stewart; Byron White · Abe Fortas

Case opinions
- Majority: Fortas, joined by Warren, Douglas, Clark, Brennan
- Concurrence: Black
- Concurrence: White
- Concur/dissent: Harlan
- Dissent: Stewart

Laws applied
- U.S. Const. Amends. VI, XIV

In re Gault, 387 U.S. 1 (1967), is a landmark U.S. Supreme Court decision which held the Due Process Clause of the 14th Amendment applies to juvenile defendants as well as to adult defendants. Juveniles accused of crimes in a delinquency proceeding must be afforded many of the same due process rights as adults, such as the right to timely notification of the charges, the right to confront witnesses, the right against self-incrimination, and the right to counsel. The court's opinion was written by Justice Abe Fortas, a noted proponent of children's rights.

== Background ==
In June 1964, the sheriff of Gila County, Arizona, took 15-year-old Gerald Gault into custody, without notifying Gault's parents, after a neighbor, Ora Cook, complained of receiving an inappropriate and offensive telephone call. After returning home from work that evening to find her son missing, Gault's mother eventually located him at the county jail, but was not permitted to take him home.

According to Gerald, his friend Ronald Lewis made the call from the Gault family's trailer. Gerald claims that Lewis had asked to use the telephone while Gerald was getting ready for work. Then, not yet knowing to whom Lewis was speaking, Gault said, "I heard him, ahem, using some pretty vulgar language... so I – all I did was walk out, took the phone off him, hung it up, and told him – I said, 'Hey, there's the door. Get out.'" At the time, Gerald was on probation after having been previously found in the company of another boy who had stolen a woman's purse.

Judge Robert McGhee of the Gila County superior court, acting as a juvenile court judge, presided over Gerald's preliminary hearing the next morning, which he ended by saying he would "think about it", and Gerald remained in custody for several more days until he was released, without explanation. On Gault's release, his mother received a note from the superintendent of the detention home informing her that "Judge McGhee has set Monday June 15, 1964 at 11:00 a.m. as the date and time for further Hearings on Gerald's delinquency." That was the family's only notification of the hearing.

At the hearing, McGhee found "that said minor is a delinquent child, and that said minor is of the age of 15 years" and ordered him confined at the State Industrial School "for the period of his minority [that is, until 21], unless sooner discharged by due process of law." The charge listed in the report prepared by the county probation officers was "Lewd Phone Calls". Had Gault been convicted as an adult for a violation of ARS § 13-377, the punishment was a maximum prison sentence of two months and a fine of $5 to $50.

Gault's accuser, Cook, was not present at either hearing; McGhee said "she didn't have to be present." More than forty years later, Gault said, "I still don't know what that lady looks like." With no witnesses having been sworn and the court making no transcript of either hearing, those present later disagreed about what had occurred during the June 1964 hearings. In particular, Gault's parents contested McGhee's claim that the teenager had admitted in court to making any of the alleged lewd statements.

Arizona law then permitted no appeal in juvenile cases and Gault's parents petitioned the Arizona Supreme Court for a writ of habeas corpus to obtain their son's release; the Supreme Court referred the case back to McGhee for hearing. On August 17, "McGhee was vigorously cross-examined as to the basis for his actions." He testified:

Well, there is a – I think it amounts to disturbing the peace. I can't give you the section, but I can tell you the law, that when one person uses lewd language in the presence of another person, that it can amount to – and I consider that when a person makes it over the phone, that it is considered in the presence, I might be wrong, that is one section. The other section upon which I consider the boy delinquent is Section 8-201, Subsection (d), habitually involved in immoral matters.

The first law McGhee mentioned was Arizona Revised Statutes (ARS) § 13-377, which made a misdemeanor of using "vulgar, abusive or obscene language" while "in the presence or hearing of any woman or child." Violating that law, then, would meet the ARS § 8-201(6)(a) criterion for classification as a "delinquent child", a "child who has violated a law of the state or an ordinance or regulation of a political subdivision thereof." The alternate criterion McGhee cited was that of ARS § 8-201(6)(d): "A child who habitually so deports himself as to injure or endanger the morals or health of himself or others." McGhee found Gault delinquent for (1) on one occasion using obscene language on the telephone with a woman and (2) being "habitually" dangerous. The evidence for the latter, according to McGhee's testimony, was that (a) two years earlier there had been a vague report, which the court had not acted upon due to, in McGhee's words, a "lack of material foundation" concerning the theft of a baseball glove; and (b) Gault's admission that in the past he had made telephone calls the judge described as "silly calls, or funny calls, or something like that." On that basis, Judge McGhee ordered the teenager to serve six years in juvenile detention.

After McGhee dismissed the habeas petition, the Gaults appealed to the state Supreme Court (99 Ariz. 181 (1965)), based on the following:

1. the Arizona Juvenile Code was unconstitutional because it (a) did not require that either the accused or his parents be notified of the specific charges against him; (b) did not require that the parents be given notice of hearings; and (c) allowed no appeal; and
2. the Juvenile Court's actions constituted a denial of due process because of (a) the lack of notification of the charges against Gault or of the hearings; (b) the court's failure to inform the Gaults of their right to counsel, right to confront the accuser, and right to remain silent; (c) the admission of "unsworn hearsay testimony;" and (d) the lack of any records of the proceedings.

The Arizona Supreme Court affirmed the dismissal of the petition. The court acknowledged that the constitutionality of the Juvenile Court proceedings required adherence to due process and that the Arizona Juvenile Code, in general, and the Gault proceedings, in specific, did not violate due process. The case was appealed to the US Supreme Court, where it was argued by NYU Law professor Norman Dorsen, a former Harlan clerk (OT '57) who later became president of the ACLU.

== Decision ==
In an 8–1 decision, the U.S. Supreme Court ruled that Gault's commitment to the State Industrial School was a violation of the Sixth Amendment since he had been denied the right to an attorney, had not been formally notified of the charges against him, had not been informed of his right against self-incrimination, and had had no opportunity to confront his accusers.

Justice Potter Stewart was the sole dissenter. He argued that the purpose of juvenile court was correction, not punishment, and so the constitutional procedural safeguards for criminal trials should not apply to juvenile trials.
