= Gideon's Trumpet =

1964 book by Anthony Lewis

- First edition cover
- Author: Anthony Lewis
- Publisher: Random House
- Publication date: 1964

Gideon's Trumpet is a 1964 book by Anthony Lewis describing the story behind the 1963 landmark court case Gideon v. Wainwright, in which the Supreme Court of the United States ruled that criminal defendants have the right to an attorney even if they cannot afford one. In 1965, the book won an Edgar Award from the Mystery Writers of America for Best Fact Crime book.

A made-for-TV movie, Gideons's Trumpet, based on the book was released in 1980, starring Henry Fonda as Clarence Earl Gideon, José Ferrer as Abe Fortas and John Houseman as Earl Warren (though Warren's name was never mentioned in the film; he was billed simply as "The Chief Justice"). Houseman also provided the offscreen closing narration at the end of the film. Lewis appeared as himself in a small role as "The Reporter". The movie was a Hallmark Hall of Fame presentation produced by Worldvision, and aired on CBS.

The name is a play on words, using the defendant's last name and invoking the biblical story in which Gideon ordered his small force to attack a much larger enemy camp. Gideon's army carried trumpets and concealed torches in clay pots. When the call to attack came, the noise and light they made tricked their enemies into thinking that a much larger army was attacking them. Thus, Gideon won the battle with little actual fighting (Judges 7:16-22).
