= Clarence Earl Gideon =

Defendant in landmark court case

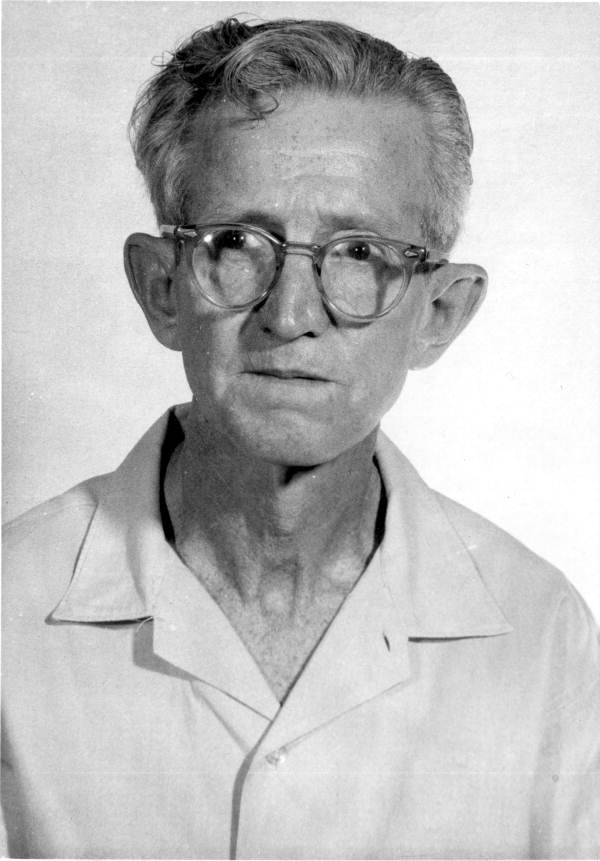
- Gideon in c. 1961
- Born: August 30, 1910; Hannibal, Missouri, U.S.
- Died: January 18, 1972 (aged 61); Fort Lauderdale, Florida, U.S.
- Occupations: Bartender; Tugboat Laborer; Electrician; Shoemaker; Pool Hall Owner
- Status: Acquitted
- Convictions: Robbery, burglary, larceny, theft (multiple)
- Penalty: Multiple sentences

Clarence Earl Gideon (August 30, 1910 – January 18, 1972) was an impoverished American drifter accused in a Florida state court of felony breaking and entering. While in prison, he appealed his case to the U.S. Supreme Court, resulting in the landmark 1963 decision Gideon v. Wainwright holding that a criminal defendant who cannot afford to hire a lawyer must be provided one at no cost.

At Gideon's first trial in August 1961, he was denied legal counsel and was forced to represent himself, and was convicted. After the Supreme Court ruled in Gideon v. Wainwright that the state had to provide defense counsel in criminal cases at no cost to the indigent, Florida retried Gideon. At his second trial, which took place in August 1963, with a court-appointed lawyer representing him and bringing out for the jury the weaknesses in the prosecution's case, Gideon was acquitted.

== Early life ==
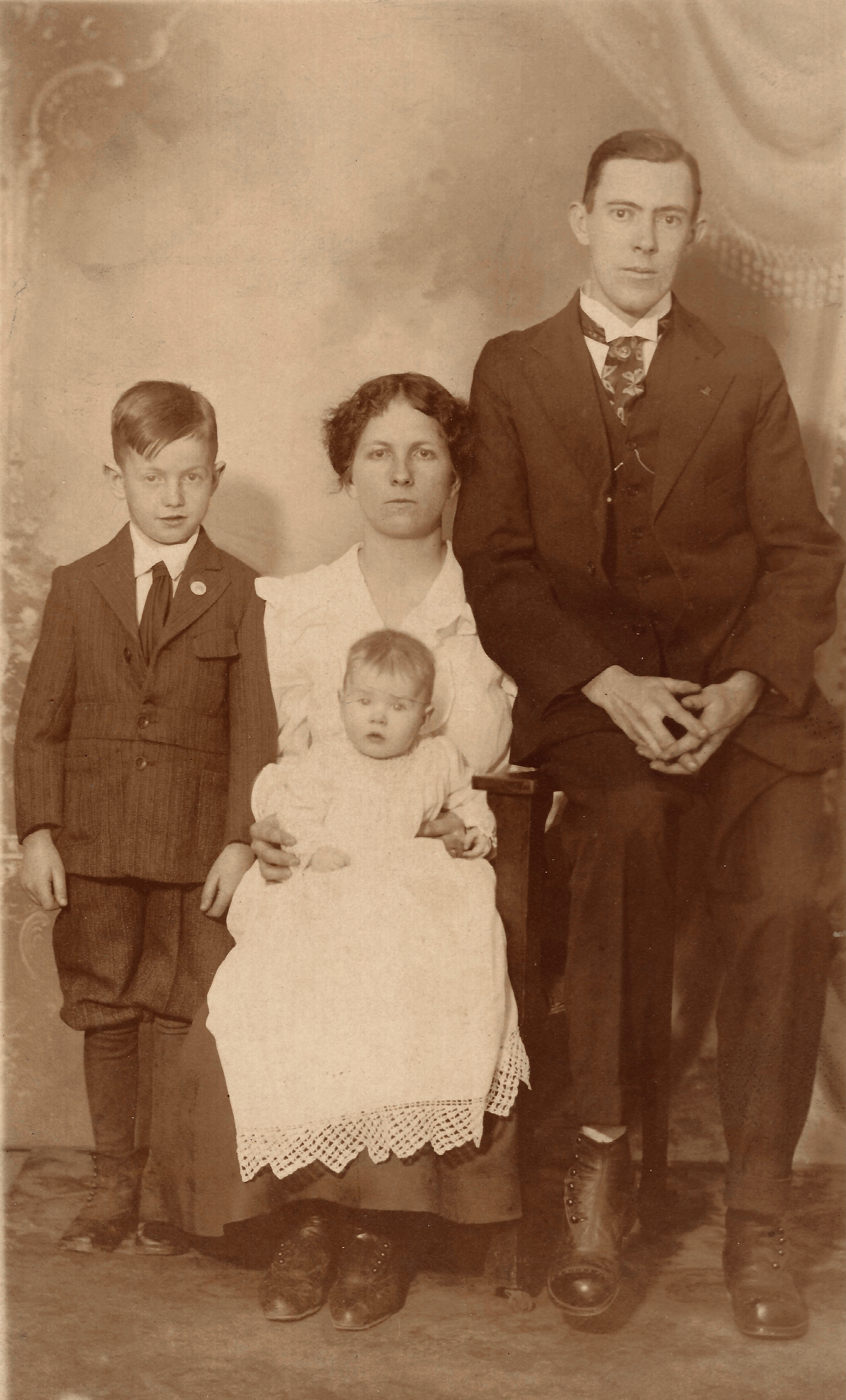
Clarence Earl Gideon with mother Virginia (Jennie) Ann Gregory Gideon Anderson, stepfather Marion Francis Anderson, and half-sister Frances Marie Anderson (circa 1918).

Clarence Earl Gideon was born in Hannibal, Missouri. His father, Charles Roscoe Gideon, died within days of his third birthday. His mother, Virginia Gregory Gideon, married Marion Francis Anderson in 1915. She gave birth to Gideon’s half-sister, Frances Marie Anderson, in 1917 and Gideon’s half-brother, Russell Lee Anderson, in 1930.

Gideon’s earliest memory was of his mother’s marriage to his stepfather, whom he described as a "good man." Both of his parents worked in a shoe factory. They owned their own home, which Gideon understood his mother bought with his father’s life insurance. Gideon felt his parents lived by the “best moral customs.” They were members of Calvary Baptist Church in Hannibal, which Gideon also joined when he was about 13.

Gideon wrote that his “stepfather never could accept me or I could not accept him.” He described his mother as “very strict” while, in contrast, he described himself as an "individualist" or “a person who will not conform.” He remembered his parents were “always quarrelling,” and that he was “the scapegoat of those quarrels.” He felt his life as a child was “miserable” and that he was not allowed to do what ordinary boys did. Gideon attended public school in Hannibal. He wrote that he “never had any trouble and made my grades” up to the eighth grade.

At age 14, Gideon quit school, ran away and "accepted the life of a hobo and tramp in preference to my home.” He "wandered around" California and the west for almost a year, learning “how good people can be and how bad they can be.”

Upon returning to Missouri, Gideon moved in with his mother’s brother. When found by his mother, she had him placed in the Hannibal jail. He soon escaped and hid in the country. The weather being cold, he stole clothes from a country store. The next day, the store owner caught Gideon wearing the stolen items. He was sentenced to three years in the reformatory but was paroled after serving one year. Late in his life, he said that “[of] all the prisons I have been in that was the worst” and that he was still physically scarred from the “whippings” he received there.

Back in Hannibal at age 16, Gideon went to work at the shoe factory for two dollars per day, advancing to a piece work job making about 25 dollars a week. Soon thereafter, he married a girl his age. He wrote that they did “very well together” for over a year until he lost his job.

== Adulthood ==
At age 18, Gideon was arrested in Missouri and charged with robbery, burglary, and larceny. Gideon was sentenced to 10 years but released after three, in 1932, as the Great Depression was beginning.

Gideon spent most of the next three decades in poverty. He served additional prison terms at Leavenworth, Kansas, for stealing government property; in Missouri for stealing, larceny, and escape; and in Texas three times for theft.

Gideon's first, second and third marriages all ended quickly, but the fourth to Ruth Ada Babineaux in October 1955 endured. They settled in Orange, Texas, in the mid-1950s. Gideon found irregular work as a tugboat laborer and bartender until he was bedridden by tuberculosis for three years.

In addition to the three children that Ruth already had, Gideon and Ruth had three others, born in 1956, 1957, and 1959: the first two in Orange, the third after the family had moved to Panama City, Florida. The six children were later removed by welfare authorities. Gideon worked as an electrician in Florida but began gambling for money. He did not serve more time in jail until 1961.

== Arrest and trial ==
=== Arrest ===
On June 3, 1961, someone allegedly stole $50 (equivalent to $539 in 2025) from the jukebox at the Bay Harbor Pool Room in Panama City, along with $5 in change and a few bottles of beer and Coca-Cola. Henry Cook, a 22-year-old resident who lived nearby, told the police that he had seen Gideon walk out of the bar with a bottle of wine and his pockets filled with coins, and then get into a cab. Gideon was later arrested at a tavern.

=== First trial ===
Too poor to afford counsel, Gideon was forced to defend himself at his trial after being denied a lawyer by the trial judge, Robert McCrary Jr. At the time, Florida law only gave indigent defendants no-cost legal counsel in death penalty cases. On August 4, 1961, Gideon was convicted of breaking with intent to commit petty larceny, and on August 25, Judge McCrary gave Gideon the maximum sentence, five years in state prison.

=== Gideon v. Wainwright ===
While incarcerated, Gideon studied the American legal system. He concluded that Judge McCrary had violated his constitutional right to counsel under the Sixth Amendment to the United States Constitution, applicable to Florida through the due process clause of the Fourteenth Amendment to the United States Constitution. He then wrote to an FBI office in Florida and then to the Florida Supreme Court, but was denied assistance. In January 1962, he mailed a five-page petition for writ of certiorari to the Supreme Court of the United States, asking the nine justices to consider his case. The Supreme Court agreed to hear his appeal. The case was originally called Gideon v. Cochran and was argued on January 15, 1963. Gideon v. Cochran was changed to Gideon v. Wainwright after Louie L. Wainwright replaced H. G. Cochran as the director of the Florida Department of Corrections.

Abe Fortas (later a Supreme Court justice himself) was assigned to represent Gideon. Florida Assistant Attorney General Bruce Jacob was assigned to argue against Gideon. Fortas argued that a common man with no training in law could not go up against a trained lawyer and win, and that "you cannot have a fair trial without counsel." Jacob argued that the issue at hand was a state issue, not federal; the practice of only appointing counsel under "special circumstances" in non-capital cases sufficed; that thousands of convictions would have to be thrown out if it were changed; and that Florida had followed for 21 years "in good faith" the 1942 Supreme Court ruling in Betts v. Brady.

The Supreme Court ruled unanimously in Gideon's favor in a landmark decision on March 18, 1963.

=== Second trial ===
About 2,000 convicted persons in Florida alone were freed as a result of the Gideon decision; however, Gideon himself was to receive a retrial.

After the decision, Abe Fortas wrote to Gideon suggesting that a Florida lawyer represent him for his retrial in a Florida court. Fortas arranged for a lawyer from Miami who worked with the Florida Civil Liberties Union, and this lawyer also recruited a second Miami lawyer who was an experienced criminal lawyer.

However, in the court of Judge Robert McCrary in Panama City, Gideon said he did not want the Miami lawyers. Asked who he wanted, he said he wanted local lawyer Fred Turner. Turner agreed, and the judge scheduled the retrial for one month later on August 5, 1963 (this would be five months after the Supreme Court decision). Judge McCrary also offered to release him on $1,000 bail, but Gideon could not raise the money.

During the trial, Turner brought out that eyewitness Henry Cook had lied in the first trial about not having a criminal conviction. Turner also asked, "Why did they put you off two blocks from your home when they'd driven you sixty miles?" And in his closing statement, Turner suggested that Cook had likely been the lookout for a group of young men who had stolen the beer and coins from the Bay Harbor Pool Room. (Turner had in fact been Cook's lawyer in previous cases.)

Police Detective Duell Pitts referred to his notes and stated that the following had been stolen from the Bay Harbor Pool Room: 4 fifths of wine, 12 bottles of Coca-Cola, 12 cans of beer, approximately $5 from the cigarette machine, and approximately $60 from the juke box. All of the money was in coins. Detective Pitts stated that Gideon had approximately $25 of coins on him when arrested.

Turner also received a statement from the cab driver who transported Gideon from the phone booth outside Henderson's Grocery & Market to a bar in Panama City, stating that Gideon was carrying neither wine, beer, nor Coca-Cola when he picked him up, even though Cook testified that he watched Gideon walk from the pool hall to the phone, then wait for a cab. However, the driver did testify that Gideon paid for the ride with six quarters.

The prosecution brought out that Gideon had said to the cab driver, "If anyone asks where you left me off, you don't know, you haven't seen me." The defense stated that Gideon had said the same thing on other occasions, with the cab driver stating, "I understand it was his wife — he had trouble with his wife." This second part had not been brought out in the first trial.

The jury acquitted Gideon after an hour of deliberation.

Anthony Lewis wrote, "Gideon's insistence on having a local lawyer — Fred Turner — may well have won the case for him. It is doubtful that the Civil Liberties Union lawyers from Miami could have been so effective with a Panama City jury.

=== Children ===
Abe Fortas asked Gideon to send him an autobiographical letter. In response, Gideon wrote a 22-page, hand-printed letter on prison stationery, with a major concern expressed in the letter being for the well-being and custody of his children.

In the letter, Gideon wrote that although the Florida state welfare agency temporarily provided a lesser amount, they did not provide the regular, ongoing amount of child welfare because both he and his wife had criminal records. A local church provided some additional help. And while Gideon and his wife were separated, he had an arrangement with a Florida welfare agency for him to provide $45 a week, which was then transferred to his family.

Gideon concluded his letter by writing, "Thank you for reading all of this. Please try to believe that all I want now from life is the chance for the love of my children the only real love I have ever had."

Gideon's half-brother, who was a sergeant in the U.S. Air Force, moving back home from Japan, adopted the children.

=== Legacy ===
In 1963, then United States Attorney General Robert F. Kennedy remarked about the case:

If an obscure Florida convict named Clarence Earl Gideon had not sat down in prison with a pencil and paper to write a letter to the Supreme Court; and if the Supreme Court had not taken the trouble to look at the merits in that one crude petition among all the bundles of mail it must receive every day, the vast machinery of American law would have gone on functioning undisturbed. But Gideon did write that letter; the court did look into his case; he was re-tried with the help of competent defense counsel; found not guilty and released from prison after two years of punishment for a crime he did not commit. And the whole course of legal history has been changed.

== Later life and death ==
After his acquittal, Gideon resumed his previous way of life and later married for the fifth time. He died of cancer in Fort Lauderdale, Florida, on January 18, 1972, at age 61. Gideon's family had him buried in an unmarked grave in Hannibal. In 1984, the local chapter of the American Civil Liberties Union added a granite headstone. Engraved on the stone is a line from Gideon's 1962 letter to Abe Fortas: "I believe that each era finds an improvement in law for the benefit of mankind."

== Portrayal on film ==
Gideon was portrayed by Henry Fonda in the 1980 made-for-television film Gideon's Trumpet, based on Anthony Lewis' book of the same name. The film was the first telecast as part of the Hallmark Hall of Fame anthology series, and co-starred José Ferrer as Abe Fortas, the attorney who pleaded Gideon's right to have a lawyer in the US Supreme Court. Fonda was nominated for an Emmy Award for his portrayal of Gideon.

== See also ==
- Miranda v. Arizona (1966)
- Argersinger v. Hamlin (1972)
