= Gideon's Trumpet (film) =

American made-for-television film

- VHS cover
- Genre: Historical drama
- Based on: Gideon's Trumpet by Anthony Lewis
- Written by: David W. Rintels
- Directed by: Robert L. Collins
- Starring: Henry Fonda; José Ferrer; John Houseman; Fay Wray; Sam Jaffe; Dean Jagger; Nicholas Pryor
- Music by: Joseph Weiss
- Country of origin: United States
- Original language: English

Production
- Executive producer: John Houseman
- Producer: David W. Rintels
- Cinematography: Don H. Birnkrant
- Editor: Frank Bracht
- Running time: 104 minutes
- Production company: Gideon Productions

Original release
- Network: CBS
- Release: April 30, 1980

Gideon's Trumpet is a 1980 American made-for-television historical drama film based on the biographical book of the same name written by Anthony Lewis. The film depicts the historical events before and during the 1963 United States Supreme Court case of Gideon v. Wainwright that brought the right of an attorney to criminal defendants who could not afford it and did not meet special requirements to get one for free. After the ruling, implements of the case were enacted publicly, nationally, and even globally.

The film, distributed by Worldvision Enterprises, premiered on April 30, 1980, on CBS-TV as a Hallmark Hall of Fame film. The feature stars Henry Fonda as the titular Clarence Earl Gideon, José Ferrer as Abe Fortas, and John Houseman as the Chief Justice of the United States. Other notable actors in the film included Fay Wray, Sam Jaffe and Dean Jagger. Robert L. Collins directed the film. It was produced and written under the direction of John Houseman and David W. Rintels. The film was recognized and nominated for three Primetime Emmy Awards the same year it premiered on television on September 7, 1980.

== Plot ==
The story starts with the title character Clarence Earl Gideon looking into the camera and remarking how he would try to give a full account of his situation, even though he may not remember everything. The film shifts to a bar in Panama City, Florida, in summer 1961, where several people notice the pool room was broken into and money stolen from the register. This leads to the arrest of Gideon, who was seen using a nearby payphone the same night the pool room was broken into.

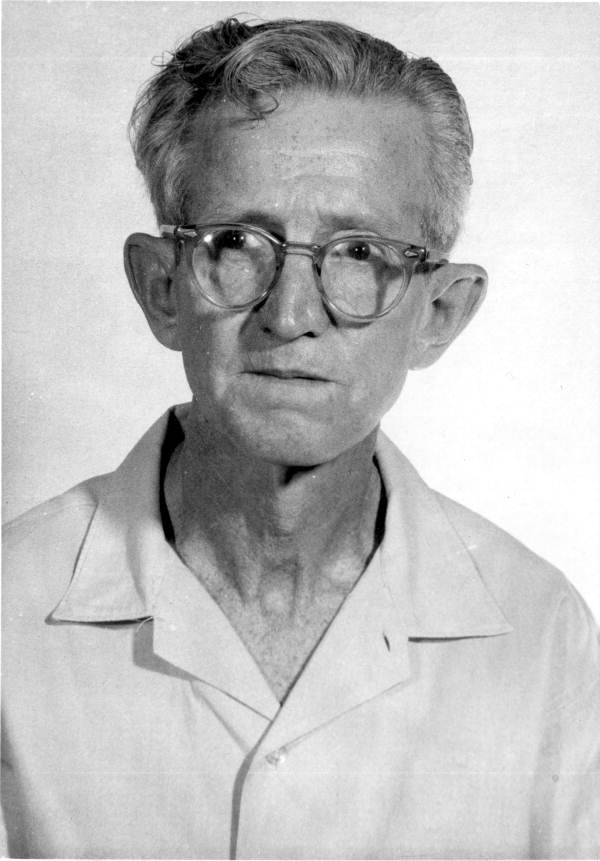
A photograph of Clarence Earl Gideon

On the day of his trial, he asks for a defense attorney to be assigned to represent him because he cannot afford to pay one himself, but Judge Robert McCrary refuses his request even though Gideon claims it is his right to have an attorney in his trial. After the cross-examinations of witnesses against and for Gideon, and much deliberation from the jury based on how Gideon represented himself in the trial, Gideon is convicted and sentenced to five years in state prison. While there, Gideon often visits the prison's library researching how the law of the United States plays out, gaining support and reverence from his fellow inmates.

From all this research, he makes arrangements to write a writ of certiorari petition to the Supreme Court. The Chief Justice and the other eight justices review other petitions before they come across Gideon's. Before they decide to follow through with his petition, the justices debate whether they can argue for a case in which a right to an attorney is given to everyone regardless of special qualifications. Gideon receives the letter stating they have accepted to hear his case. In order to collect more information, Abe Fortas asks Gideon for a biography to see if he has any special circumstances. Once this personal information is received, Fortas soon realizes that Gideon does not match any special circumstances. Fortas goes to trial against the prosecutor and wins the case so Gideon can be tried again, this time with an attorney.

Although Gideon is disappointed by having to go through a retrial, he is given an excellent attorney in the area by the name of Fred Turner. At the second trial, Gideon asserts that the retrial is unconstitutional and falls under double jeopardy. Unfortunately for Gideon, the judge rules the retrial does not fall under double jeopardy and allows it to proceed.

The prosecuting team gives their remarks and discusses matters in almost the same way they did at Gideon's first trial. Turner notes a credibility flaw in one of the main witnesses, and he receives more information from other individuals who had previously been questioned. Turner is able to shed some light on newly found evidence and other information in regard to what happened on the night of the robbery. After some time, the jury decides Gideon is not guilty, and he is released from prison. Gideon walks out of the courthouse, content and relieved.

As the camera pans out, a narrator reads the following quote by Robert F. Kennedy:

If an obscure Florida convict named Clarence Earl Gideon had not sat down in prison with a pencil and paper to write a letter to the Supreme Court; and if the Supreme Court had not taken the trouble to look at the merits in that one crude petition among all the bundles of mail it must receive every day, the vast machinery of American law would have gone on functioning undisturbed. But Gideon did write that letter; the court did look into his case; he was re-tried with the help of competent defense counsel; found not guilty and released from prison after two years of punishment for a crime he did not commit. And the whole course of legal history has been changed.

== Cast ==
- Henry Fonda as Clarence Earl Gideon
- José Ferrer as Abe Fortas
- John Houseman as Chief Justice
- Fay Wray as Edna Curtis
- Sam Jaffe as First Supreme Court Justice
- Dean Jagger as Sixth Supreme Court Justice
- Nicholas Pryor as Jacob
- William Prince as Fifth Supreme Court Justice
- Lane Smith as Fred Turner
- Richard McKenzie as Judge Robert McCrary
- Richard Lineman as Lester Wade
- Dolph Sweet as Charlie
- Ford Rainey as Second Supreme Court Justice
- David Sheiner as Abe Krash
- J. Patrick McNamara as Harris
- Les Lannom as Bobby Earl

Anthony Lewis, the author of Gideon's Trumpet, also made a cameo role as a reporter in the final scenes of the film.

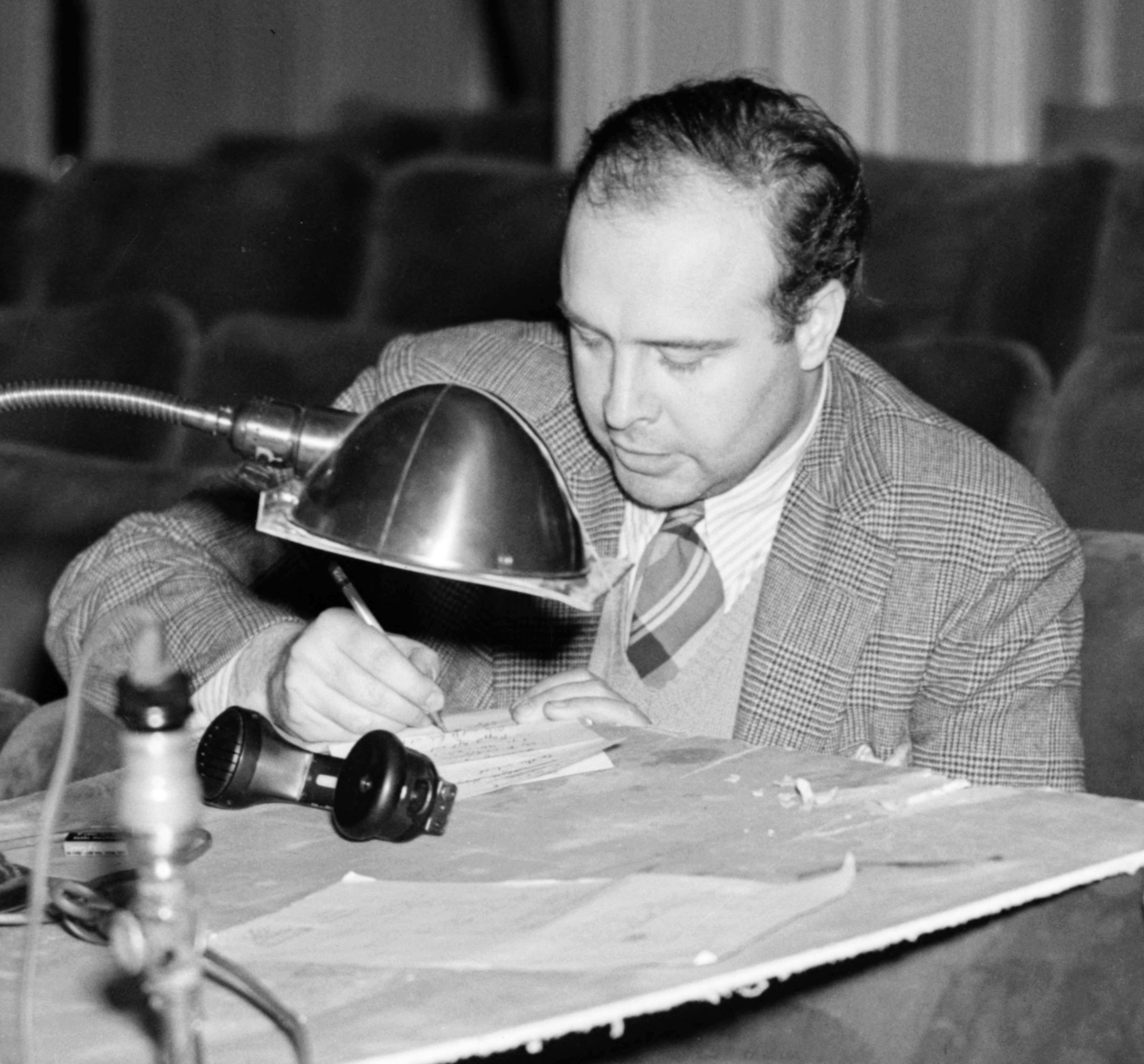
John Houseman played the Chief Justice in the film.

== Historical background ==
Before Gideon v. Wainwright, there was a history of cases related to the right of counsel that were involved in criminal procedure in the United States. During the time of the case, there was a political shift toward how much the federal government could control in regard to federal law, which is shown by the Warren Court.

In regard to how well the film depicts the case historically, the film does not mention the name of the Chief Justice, but the Chief Justice of the United States at that time was Earl Warren. In the public recently, the case has differing opinions among many scholars into how well it is implemented. In the United States, measures have been taken to ensure the case can apply to the state laws and federal laws included in the United States Constitution. Globally, the case has influenced changes to policies concerning the right to counsel, but the qualifications that determine the right of counsel still vary from country to country.

== Production ==
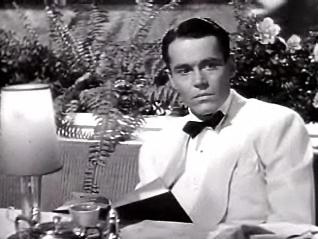
Henry Fonda starred as the title character of Clarence Earl Gideon in his later years.

=== Filming ===
The prison scenes in the film were captured at the Men's Correctional Facility in Chino, California, using as extras prison inmates currently in the facility. Director Robert Collins commented on how difficult filming was with the prison inmates as extras: "By the time the production crew made four takes, the prisoners were very unhappy." Collins has also remarked that he took special care filming the prison scenes by making them more "harsh" than the court scenes because he wanted to create a "contrast" in those scenes. Fonda, who played the title character, also made some comments about how "fascinating" it was to play the role of Clarence Gideon, although he had not usually played similar roles in his past productions.

== Reception ==
=== Release ===
On April 30, 1980, the day of the premiere, an article in The New York Times was released to notify potential viewers. In it, John J. O'Connor compliments the show by saying, "The law and its intricacies are not the most promising subjects for compelling drama. But Anthony Lewis, a writer for The New York Times, demonstrated that complex arguments and legal briefs could indeed be absorbing in his 1964 book 'Gideon's Trumpet'. And tonight at 9 o'clock on CBS-TV, an adaptation by David W. Rintels of that book makes the same point with remarkable success."

Just weeks earlier, the American Bar Association Journal released an article entitled Blowing Gideon's Trumpet. Emmet Lavery highlights the producer when she writes, "Rintels has won three Gavel Awards from the American Bar Association for his television productions."

=== Critical response ===
David Cornelius of DVD Talk, wrote, "Nearly three decades since its initial broadcast, it still holds a place as a triumph of televised storytelling."

In May 1980, Variety magazine reviewed the television show as it was recently named in the Hallmark Hall of Fame. The author summarized the film and remarked, "As propaganda for an enlightened view of civil liberties, 'Gideon's Trumpet' offers, implicitly, a sharp indictment of the Burger Court's retreat from the kinds of decisions, like the one in the Gideon case, that marked the Warren Court as a sharp defender of the rights of the individual."

=== Awards and honors ===
Award	Category	Recipient	Result	Ref.
Primetime Emmy Awards	Outstanding Drama or Comedy Special	John Houseman, David W. Rintels	Nominated	
Primetime Emmy Awards	Outstanding Lead Actor in a Limited Series or a Special	Henry Fonda	Nominated	
Primetime Emmy Awards	Outstanding Writer in a Limited Series or a Special	David W. Rintels	Nominated	

== See also ==
- Gideon's Trumpet (the book)
