= Abe Fortas =

US Supreme Court justice from 1965 to 1969

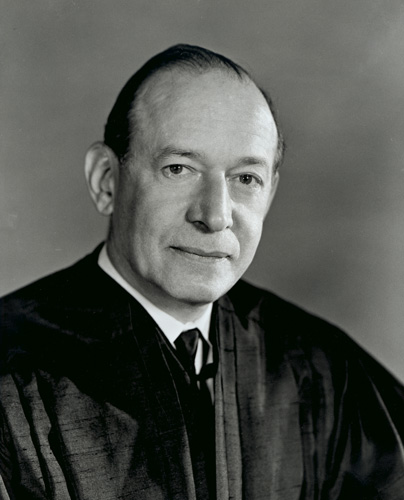

Associate Justice of the Supreme Court of the United States
- In office October 4, 1965 – May 14, 1969
- Nominated by: Lyndon B. Johnson
- Preceded by: Arthur Goldberg
- Succeeded by: Harry Blackmun

United States Under Secretary of the Interior
- In office January 1, 1944 – January 12, 1946
- President: Franklin D. Roosevelt; Harry S. Truman
- Preceded by: Himself
- Succeeded by: Oscar L. Chapman
- In office June 23, 1942 – November 16, 1943
- Preceded by: John J. Dempsey
- Succeeded by: None (position vacant)

Personal details
- Born: Abraham Fortas; June 19, 1910 Memphis, Tennessee, U.S.
- Died: April 5, 1982 (aged 71) Washington, D.C., U.S.
- Party: Democratic
- Spouse: Carolyn Agger (m. 1935)
- Education: Rhodes College (BA); Yale University (LLB)

Military service
- Allegiance: United States
- Branch/service: United States Navy
- Years of service: 1943
- Rank: Seaman Apprentice
- Unit: Naval Training Station Sampson

Abraham Fortas (June 19, 1910 – April 5, 1982) was an American lawyer and jurist who served as an associate justice of the Supreme Court of the United States from 1965 to 1969. Born and raised in Memphis, Tennessee, Fortas graduated from Rhodes College and Yale Law School. He later became a law professor at Yale and then an advisor for the U.S. Securities and Exchange Commission. Fortas worked at the Department of the Interior under President Franklin D. Roosevelt, and was appointed by President Harry S. Truman to delegations that helped set up the United Nations in 1945.

In 1948, Fortas represented Lyndon B. Johnson in the dispute over the Democratic U.S. Senate nomination, and he formed close ties with Johnson. Fortas also represented Clarence Earl Gideon before the U.S. Supreme Court in the landmark case Gideon v. Wainwright, involving the right to counsel. Nominated by Johnson to the Supreme Court in 1965, Fortas was confirmed by the Senate, and maintained a close working relationship with the president. As a justice, Fortas wrote several landmark opinions in cases such as In re Gault and Tinker v. Des Moines Independent Community School District.

In 1968, Johnson tried to elevate Fortas to the position of Chief Justice of the United States, but that nomination faced a filibuster and was withdrawn. Fortas later resigned from the Court after a controversy involving his acceptance of $20,000 from financier Louis Wolfson while Wolfson was being investigated for insider trading. The Justice Department investigated Fortas at the behest of President Richard Nixon. Attorney General John N. Mitchell pressured Fortas into resigning. Following his resignation, Fortas returned to private practice, occasionally appearing before the justices with whom he had served.

== Early years ==
Abe Fortas was the youngest of five children born to Orthodox Jewish immigrants Woolfe Fortas (Yiddish: וואָלף פאָרטאַס) (Note: Woolfe Fortas eventually changed his name to William. In some documents, Woolfe is spelled Woolf or Wolf.) and Rachel "Ray" Berzansky Fortas (Yiddish: רחל בערזשאנסקי פארטאס) (Note: In some sources, Rachel is spelled Rachael, and Berzansky is spelled Berzanski. A common alias for Rachel Berzansky is Ray Berson.) in Memphis, Tennessee. Woolfe, originally from Russia, worked as a cabinetmaker, and together with Rachel, who hailed from Lithuania, they operated a store. Fortas developed a lifelong passion for music, largely influenced by his father, who encouraged him to play the violin—an instrument he would cherish throughout his life. He took violin lessons from local Catholic nuns at St. Patrick's School, which was just a block away from his home on Pontotoc Street. He also studied chamber music with the leader of a local trio. Because of his musical talents, he earned the nickname "Fiddlin' Abe Fortas." By the age of thirteen, he was playing in a dance band called the "Blue Medley Boys," which helped support him and his family. After graduating second in his class from South Side High School in 1926 at the age of sixteen, Fortas won a scholarship to Southwestern at Memphis, which is now known as Rhodes College. During his college years, he supported himself by working as a shoe salesman and performing as a violinist, as well as giving violin lessons to local children. Although he initially considered pursuing a degree in music, he ultimately decided to focus on English and political science, graduating at the top of his class in 1930.

Fortas earned scholarships from both Harvard Law School and Yale Law School but ultimately decided to attend Yale, becoming the youngest law student there at 20 years old. He became editor-in-chief of the Yale Law Journal and graduated cum laude and second in the class of 1933. One of his professors, William O. Douglas, was impressed with Fortas, and Douglas arranged for Fortas to stay at Yale to become an assistant professor of law.

Shortly thereafter, Fortas took on a series of government positions, including with the Agricultural Adjustment Administration and the U.S. Securities and Exchange Commission (SEC) in Washington, D.C. In 1937, he was made assistant director of the public utilities division at the SEC. Throughout this period, Fortas commuted between New Haven and Washington in order to fulfill his responsibilities both to Yale and to the government.

== Personal life ==
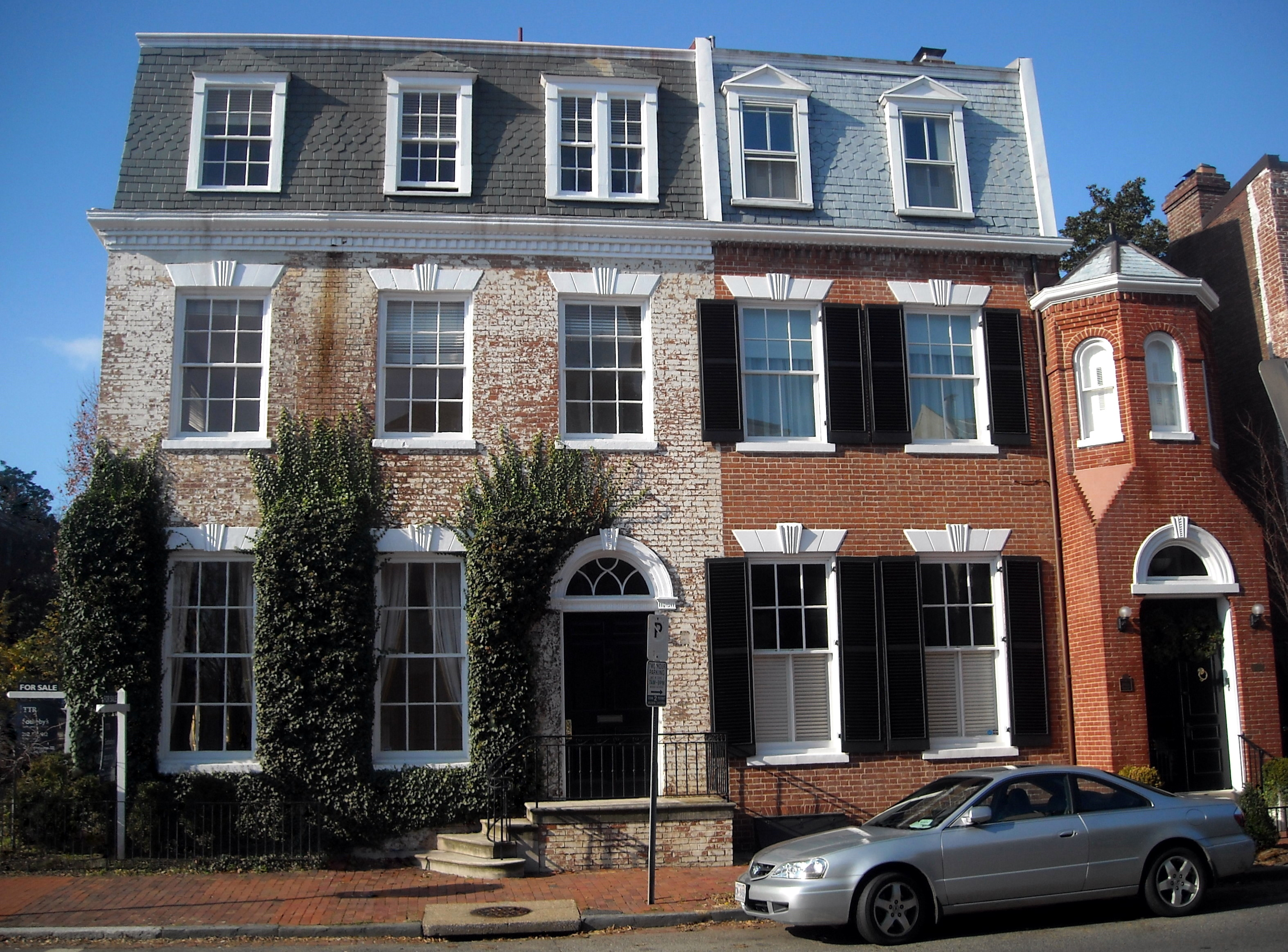
One of Fortas's former residences in Georgetown, Washington, D.C.

In 1935, Fortas married Carolyn E. Agger, who became a successful tax lawyer. They had no children, and after his appointment to the Supreme Court of the United States, they lived at 3210 R Street NW in the Georgetown section of Washington, D.C.

Fortas was first cousin of the social anthropologist, Meyer Fortes.

Just like his days in Memphis, Fortas was an amateur musician who played the violin in a string quartet, called the "N Street Strictly-no-refunds String Quartet" on Sunday evenings in Washington. Fortas was friends with well-known musicians such as Rudolf Serkin, Isaac Stern and Pablo Casals. Fortas was a good friend of the first democratically elected Governor of Puerto Rico, Luis Muñoz Marín, calling him "a spectacularly great figure". Fortas visited the island often, frequently lobbied for the island's interests in Congress, participated in drafting the Constitution of Puerto Rico, and gave legal advice to Marín's administration whenever requested.

The Puerto Rican actor José Ferrer portrayed Fortas in the film Gideon's Trumpet (1980).

== Early career ==
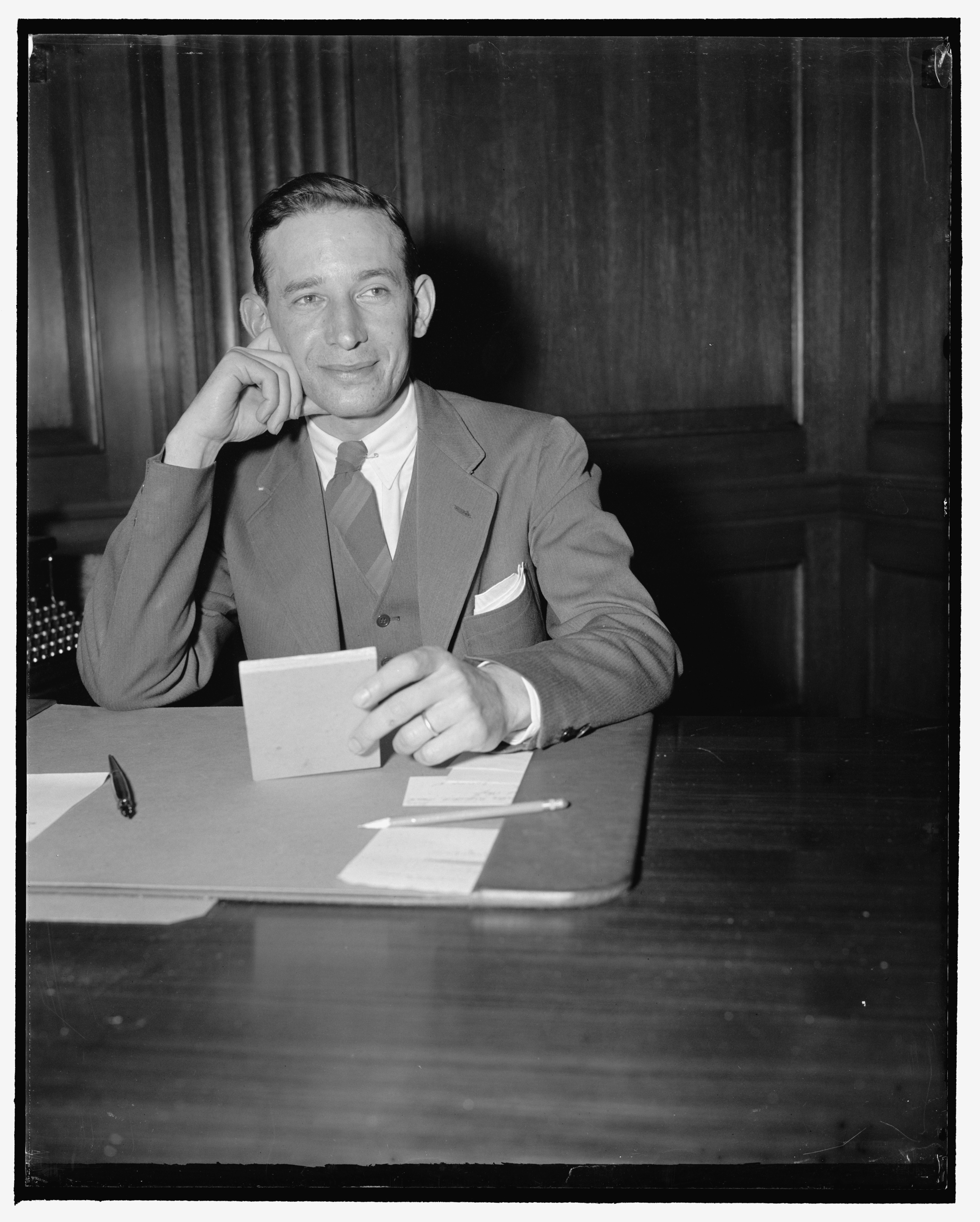
Fortas in 1939

Leaving Yale in 1939, Fortas served as general counsel of the Public Works Administration and then as Undersecretary of the Interior in Franklin D. Roosevelt's administration. While he was working at the U.S. Department of the Interior, the Secretary of the Interior, Harold L. Ickes, introduced him to a young congressman from Texas, Lyndon B. Johnson.

In October 1943, Fortas was granted a leave of absence from the Department of Interior to enlist in the United States Navy for World War II. Assigned to Naval Training Station Sampson, New York for his initial training, in December 1943 he was honorably discharged as the result of an arrested case of ocular tuberculosis that caused doctors to deem him medically unfit. He had resigned from his position at the Interior department while in the navy, but was reappointed in January 1944. In 1945, he was appointed by President Harry S. Truman as an advisor to the U.S. delegation during the organizational meeting of the United Nations (UN) in San Francisco, and at the 1946 General Assembly meeting in London.

== Private practice ==
In 1946, after leaving government service, Fortas founded a law firm, Arnold & Fortas, with Thurman Arnold. Former Federal Communications Commission commissioner Paul A. Porter joined the firm in 1947; in 1965, following the appointment of Fortas to the Supreme Court, the firm was renamed as Arnold & Porter. For many years, it has remained one of Washington's most influential law firms, and today is among the most profitable law firms in the world.

In the 1948 United States Senate election in Texas, Lyndon Johnson ran for the Democratic nomination for one of the two seats in the U.S. Senate from Texas. Johnson won the Democratic primary by only 87 votes. His opponent, former Governor of Texas Coke R. Stevenson, persuaded a federal judge to issue an order taking Johnson's name off the general election ballot while the primary results were being contested. There were serious allegations of corruption in the voting process, including 200 votes for Johnson that had been cast in alphabetical order. Johnson asked Fortas for help, and Fortas persuaded Supreme Court Justice Hugo Black to overturn the ruling. Johnson then won the general election and became a U.S. Senator.

During the Red Scare of the late 1940s and early 1950s, Fortas came to widespread notice as the defense attorney for Owen Lattimore. In 1950, Fortas often clashed with Senator Joseph McCarthy when representing Lattimore before the Tydings Committee, and also before the Senate Internal Security Subcommittee.

Fortas initially opposed the creation of a presidential commission to investigate the assassination of President John F. Kennedy. When it became clear that multiple investigations were gearing up simultaneously at the city, state, and federal levels, Fortas changed his mind and advised Johnson to establish the Warren Commission.

=== Durham v. United States ===
Fortas was known in Washington circles to have a serious interest in psychiatry, still a controversial subject at the time. In 1953, this expertise led to his appointment to represent the indigent Monte W. Durham, whose insanity defense had been rejected at trial two years earlier, before a U.S. Court of Appeals.

Durham's defense had been denied because the District Court had applied the M'Naghten rules, requiring that the defense prove the accused did not know the difference between right and wrong for an insanity plea to be accepted. Adopted by the British House of Lords in 1843, generations before the origins of modern psychiatry, this test was still in common use in American courts over a century later.

The effect of this standard was to exclude psychiatric and psychological testimony almost entirely from the legal process. In a critical turning point for American criminal law, the Court of Appeals accepted Fortas's call to abandon the M'Naghten Rule and to allow for testimony and evidence regarding the defendant's mental state.

=== Gideon v. Wainwright ===
In 1963, Fortas represented Clarence Earl Gideon in his appeal before the Supreme Court. Gideon had been convicted by a Florida court of breaking into a pool hall. He could not afford a lawyer, and none was provided for him when he asked for one at trial. In its landmark ruling in Gideon v. Wainwright, the Supreme Court held for Gideon, ruling that state courts are required under the Sixth Amendment to provide counsel in criminal cases for defendants unable to afford their own. Fortas's former Yale Law School professor, longtime friend and future Supreme Court colleague, William O. Douglas praised his argument as "probably the best single legal argument" in Douglas's time on the court.

== Associate Justice of the Supreme Court ==
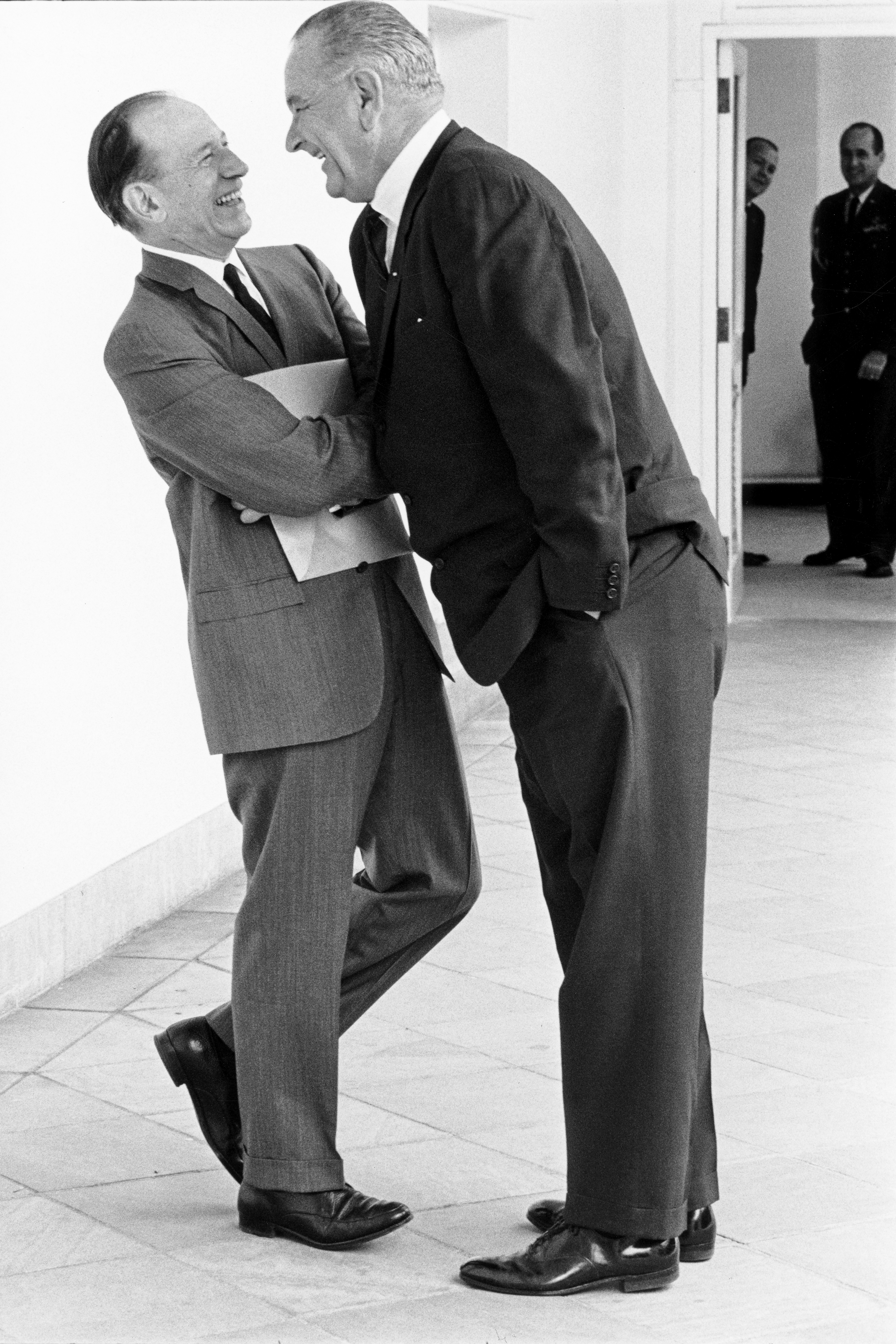
Fortas with Lyndon B. Johnson in 1965

On July 28, 1965, President Johnson nominated Fortas as an associate justice of the United States Supreme Court, to succeed Arthur Goldberg, who had resigned to become the U.S. Ambassador to the United Nations following the death of Adlai Stevenson. Johnson persuaded Goldberg to leave the Court for the U.N. in part because he wanted Fortas on the Court. Johnson thought that some of his "Great Society" reforms could be ruled unconstitutional by the Court and felt that Fortas would let him know if that was to happen. The nomination was given a favorable recommendation by the Senate Judiciary Committee two weeks later, following a one-day public hearing. He was confirmed by the U.S. Senate on August 11, 1965, and took the judicial oath of office on October 4, 1965. His appointment ensured the continuation of the Warren Court's liberal majority.

The seat Fortas occupied on the Court had come to be informally known as the "Jewish seat," as his three immediate predecessors—Goldberg, Felix Frankfurter and Benjamin Cardozo—were also Jewish.

Fortas continued to serve as an adviser to Johnson after becoming an associate justice. He attended White House staff meetings, advising the president on judicial nominations and discussing private Supreme Court deliberations with him. In 1966, he substantially edited an initial version of Johnson's State of the Union Address.

In 1968, Fortas wrote a book called Concerning Dissent and Civil Disobedience.

Fortas's law clerks included future Under Secretary of Defense for Policy Walter B. Slocombe and Martha A. Field, a scholar of constitutional law, family law, and bioethics.

=== FBI and Justice Fortas ===
In 1966, Justice Fortas informed the FBI and White House about the Fred B. Black, Jr. warrantless bugging case pending before the High Court. This included revealing conference room discussions, lobbying the justices in favor of the FBI position that this was Robert F. Kennedy's fault not J. Edgar Hoover's. This was done despite Fortas disqualifying himself from the case. The next year, Director Hoover both blackmailed and protected Justice Fortas after an allegation of sexual misconduct with a teenager. Fortas denied this allegation. Justice Fortas continued to rule on cases involving the FBI.

=== Relationship with other justices ===
Fortas had mostly good working relations with his fellow justices, although they worried that he talked to President Johnson too much. Fortas clashed with his fellow Associate Justice Hugo Black during much of his time on the Court. The two had been friends since the 1930s, and Black helped convince Fortas's wife, Carolyn Agger, to consent to his appointment to the Supreme Court. However, once both men were on the Court, they disagreed about the manner in which the Constitution should be interpreted, finding themselves on opposing sides of the Court's opinions most of the time. In 1968, a Warren clerk called their feud "one of the most basic animosities of the Court".

Fortas's best relationship was with William O. Douglas, his former law professor at Yale. Fortas was also close to Associate Justice William J. Brennan and Chief Justice Earl Warren. Brennan's offices were in the chambers next to those of Fortas. Fortas's wife recalled that Fortas "loved Warren".

Fortas called fellow associate justice John Marshall Harlan II "one of my dearest friends, although we usually are on opposite sides of the issues here."

In 1967, Fortas and Douglas dissented in the 5–4 decision Fortson v. Morris, which cleared the path for the Georgia State Legislature to choose the Governor of Georgia in the deadlocked Georgia gubernatorial election of 1966 between the Democrat Lester Maddox and the Republican Howard Callaway. Fortas said that the State Constitution of 1824, allowing the legislature to choose the governor if no one wins a majority in the general election, was at odds with the Equal Protection Clause of the 14th Amendment to the U.S. Constitution:

"If the voting right is to mean anything, it certainly must be protected against the possibility that the victory will go to the loser."

In this case, Maddox trailed Callaway by about 3,000 votes. Justice Black took the strict constructionist view that the U.S. Constitution does not dictate how a state must choose its governor:

"Our business is not to write the laws to fit the day. Our task is to interpret the Constitution."

=== Approach to oral arguments ===
Fortas was critical of justices (he specifically cited Thurgood Marshall) who frequently broke into attorneys' arguments to ask questions. As an attorney arguing before the Court, he had resented intrusions by the justices and so as a justice himself, he felt it best to let the lawyers give their arguments uninterrupted.

=== Children's and students' rights ===
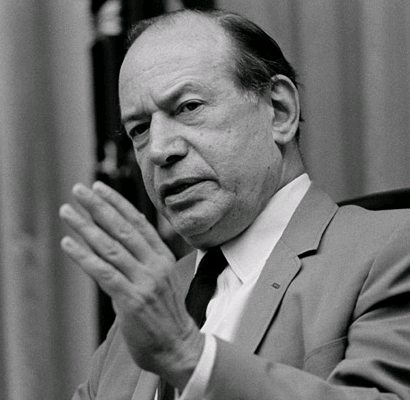
Abe Fortas in 1968

During his time on the Court, Fortas led a revolution in children's rights and juvenile justice, broadly extending the Court's logic on due process rights and procedure to legal minors and overturning the existing paradigm of parens patriae in which the state had usurped the parental role. Writing the majority decision in Kent v. United States (1966), the first Supreme Court case that evaluated a juvenile court procedure, Fortas suggested that the existing system might be "the worst of both worlds."

At that time, the state was held to have a paternal interest in the child rather than a prosecutorial one, a concept that dispensed with the obligation to provide a child accused of a crime with the opportunity to make a defense. Still, courts were empowered to decide, in the interests of the child, to have the child incarcerated for lengthy periods or otherwise severely punished.

Fortas elaborated on his critique the following year in the case of In re Gault (1967). The case concerned a 15-year-old who had been sentenced to almost six years (until his 21st birthday) in the Arizona State Industrial School for making an obscene phone call to his neighbor. Had he been an adult, the maximum punishment he could have received was a $50.00 fine or two months in jail. Fortas used the case to launch a ferocious attack on the juvenile justice system and parens patriae. His majority opinion was a landmark, extending the Fourteenth Amendment's guarantees of right to sufficient notice, right to counsel, right to confrontation of witnesses, and right against self-incrimination to certain juvenile proceedings.

Two years later, Fortas wrote another landmark in students rights with the decision in the case of Tinker v. Des Moines Independent Community School District (1969), involving two high school students and one junior high school student, who had been suspended for wearing black armbands to school to protest the Vietnam War. Fortas wrote that neither "students or teachers shed their constitutional rights to freedom of speech or expression at the schoolhouse gate".

=== Epperson v. Arkansas ===
In 1968, Fortas persuaded the court to accept the appeal of Little Rock Central High School teacher Sue Epperson who had challenged Arkansas's anti-evolution law, with the support of the state teachers union. Epperson had won the case, but the Arkansas Supreme Court had overturned the ruling. Although the Court agreed quickly after hearing the case that the Arkansas ruling should be reversed, there was no consensus as to why, most Justices favoring fairly narrow grounds. Fortas was the architect and the author of the broader landmark majority opinion that emerged in Epperson v. Arkansas, banning religiously based creation narratives from public school science curricula.

=== Presidential power ===
Fortas believed in an expanded executive branch and a less powerful legislative branch. He wrote: "The enormous growth of presidential power from Franklin D. Roosevelt to Lyndon Johnson was a necessary and an inevitable adaptation of our constitutional system to national needs."

=== Nomination to be Chief Justice ===
On June 26, 1968, Johnson nominated Fortas as Chief Justice of the United States, to succeed Earl Warren, who had submitted his resignation effective with the confirmation of a successor. Anticipating that conservative members of the Senate would have concerns about Fortas's liberal opinions, Johnson simultaneously announced that he would fill the vacancy created by Fortas's elevation with United States Court of Appeals for the Fifth Circuit Judge Homer Thornberry of Texas. The propriety of the coordinated resignation-nomination on the eve of the November presidential election was called into question by Republican candidate Richard Nixon and the media. By the time the Judiciary Committee opened hearings on the nomination on July 11, bipartisan opposition to the nomination (among Republicans and Southern Democrats) had become well organized. Fortas was the first sitting associate justice, nominated for chief justice, ever to appear before the Senate. He underwent four days of questioning about his legal career, judicial philosophy, and his relationship with President Johnson. Judiciary Committee chairman James Eastland, a Mississippi segregationist, told Johnson he "had never seen so much feeling against a man as against Fortas".

Antisemitism likely played a role in the confirmation battle. Afterward, Eastland reportedly said "After [Thurgood] Marshall, I could not go back to Mississippi if a Jewish chief justice swore in the next president." The National Socialist White People's Party undertook a phone campaign that summer, condemning Fortas as a "despicable Jew with a 'red' record that smells to high heaven". Such attacks were soundly condemned by most senators. Even so, the White House began alerting the press to growing antisemitic opposition against Fortas, and used the issue to garner support for him in the Senate. Fortas himself called the effort to defeat his nomination, "anti-Negro, anti-liberal, anti-civil rights, [and] anti-Semitic".

==== American University payments ====
During the hearing preparations, it was revealed that Fortas had accepted $15,000 ($138,876 in 2025) raised by private donors to teach nine summer seminars at American University's Washington College of Law during his tenure as a justice. The money had come, not from the university, but from private sources that represented business interests connected to 40 companies; Senator Strom Thurmond raised the idea that cases involving these companies might come to the Court, and Fortas might not be objective. While the fee itself was legal, the size of the fee raised much concern about the Court's insulation from private interests, especially as the speaking fee had been funded by former legal clients and partners of Fortas. The $15,000 represented more than 40 percent of a Supreme Court justice's salary at the time, and was seven times what any other American University seminar leader had ever been paid.

==== "Fortas Film Festival" ====
Thurmond also hammered at the issue of pornography. He condemned Fortas for voting with the majority to overturn obscenity laws dealing with pornographic films. Thurmond obtained some of the films in question and played them in the Senate building while the hearings were out of session. These showings became known as the "Fortas Film Festival", and the association of Fortas with some of the films' strip-teases and especially the rape or homosexual sex depicted in one film, Flaming Creatures, was effective in tarnishing Fortas's image and disheartening his supporters.

==== Cloture vote ====
It was not until September 17 that the Judiciary Committee took a final vote on the nomination, reporting it favorably by an 11 to 6 vote to the full Senate. Thurmond promised to filibuster, and when the senate debate began on September 25, Fortas's opponents restated every criticism they had earlier directed against Fortas, especially with regard to the issue of obscenity. Johnson remained resolute in his support for his nominee, saying to an aide: "We won't withdraw the nomination. I won't do that to Abe."

The debate lasted for four days, until a cloture motion to end the debate was made. The 45–43 vote in favor of cloture demonstrated that the nomination was in trouble. It was 14 votes short of the two-thirds majority (59 votes) needed to cut off debate and force a vote on the nomination. (35 Democrats and 10 Republicans voted to end debate, while 24 Republicans and 19 Democrats voted to continue it.) Although the vote suggested to Fortas's supporters that a slim majority favored confirmation, it effectively derailed the nomination. In light of the slim prospect for a positive outcome, Johnson withdrew Fortas's nomination.

News accounts at the time consistently described the Senate floor debate as a filibuster intended to prevent the nomination from reaching the floor, where a simple majority vote would have been enough for confirmation. Republican Senator John Cornyn asserted in 2003, however, that several senators who opposed Fortas asserted at the time they were not conducting a perpetual filibuster and were not trying to prevent a final up-or-down vote from occurring. Public debate occasionally still occurs over whether Fortas would have been confirmed in a simple majority vote. The Fortas nomination is seen as a harbinger of later filibusters of judicial nominees.

Richard Nixon won the 1968 presidential election, and Johnson did not make another nomination before his term as president expired on January 20, 1969. Earl Warren was succeeded as chief justice by Warren Burger, who was sworn into office on June 23, 1969.

=== Ethics scandal and resignation ===
Fortas remained an associate justice, but in 1969, a new scandal arose. Fortas had accepted a US $20,000 (equivalent to $176,000 in 2025) retainer from the family foundation of Wall Street financier Louis Wolfson, a friend and former client, in January 1966. In return for unspecified advice, it was to pay Fortas $20,000 a year for the rest of Fortas's life (and then pay his widow for the rest of her life). However, in order to avoid apparent impropriety, Fortas returned the money the same year and received no further payments. Fortas was not unique in receiving this type of funding and other justices had similar arrangements. William O. Douglas, Fortas's mentor, likewise received funding from casino magnate Albert Parvin through his own foundation. The American Bar Association revamped its rules as a result of the Wolfson affair, revising circumstances under which judges should not accept outside income.

Wolfson was under investigation for securities violations at the time, and it was alleged that he expected that his arrangement with Fortas would help him stave off criminal charges or help him secure a presidential pardon. He asked Fortas to help him secure a pardon from Johnson, which Fortas claimed that he did not do. Fortas recused himself from Wolfson's case when it came before the Court.

In May 1969, Life magazine chronicled Fortas's tangled relations with Wolfson. The revelation engendered calls for Fortas to be impeached, and motivated Richard Nixon, who knew that Fortas's resignation would enable the appointment of a more conservative justice, to order the Justice Department to investigate Fortas. Nixon was unsure if an investigation or prosecution was legal, but was convinced by then-Assistant Attorney General and future Chief Justice William Rehnquist that it would be.

Chief Justice Earl Warren (who, like the other Justices, was unaware of Nixon's actions) urged Fortas to resign to protect the reputation of the Court and avoid impeachment proceedings, as did Justice Hugo Black. However, when Fortas said it would "kill" his wife, Black changed his mind, realized that Nixon wanted Fortas off the Court for political reasons, and urged Fortas not to resign.

Fortas ultimately decided resignation would be best for him and for his wife's legal career after Attorney General John N. Mitchell threatened to prosecute him, and potentially investigate his wife for tax evasion. On the subject of his resignation, Justice William J. Brennan later said, "We were just stunned." Fortas later said he "resigned to save Douglas", another justice who was being investigated for a similar scandal at the same time.

Fortas resigned from the Court on May 14, 1969. When the Justice Department heard the news, the Attorney General's office celebrated, and Nixon called to congratulate them.

Fortas's seat on the Supreme Court was vacant until June 1970, when Harry Blackmun was sworn into office. This was Nixon's third attempt to fill the vacancy. His earlier failed nominations were of Clement Haynsworth in September 1969 and G. Harrold Carswell in February 1970.

Seven years later in 1977, Wolfson's lawyer Bernard Fensterwald disclosed to Washington Post reporter Bob Woodward that Wolfson had surreptitiously recorded a 1970 phone call with Fortas, also giving the Post the transcript of this phone call. The Washington Post subsequently published several excerpts, including language suggesting that Fortas might have indeed spoken with President Johnson about a pardon for Wolfson, but there was no direct evidence that it was a quid pro quo rather than a voluntary intervention for a friend. Wolfson was convicted of violating federal securities laws later that year and spent time in prison.

== Later years ==
Rebuffed in the wake of his fall by Arnold & Porter, the powerful Washington law firm he had founded, Fortas founded another firm, Fortas & Koven, and maintained a successful law practice until his death in 1982. However, his wife, Carolyn Agger, stayed with Arnold & Porter—Fortas had resigned in order to protect her job there. He turned down an offer to publish his memoirs.

At Fortas & Koven, Fortas also kept two notable non-paying clients: preeminent cellist/composer Pablo Casals and Lyndon Johnson. Johnson and Fortas remained great friends, with the latter often visiting the former president at his ranch near Stonewall, Texas, until his death in 1973. Fortas was asked to donate his papers to Johnson's presidential library by Lady Bird Johnson, but he replied that his correspondence with Johnson had always been kept in strictest confidence.

A portrait of him was placed in Yale Law School while he was still alive, underwritten by an anonymous donor. Fortas served as a longtime member of the board of directors of Carnegie Hall, including while he was on the Supreme Court. He also served on the board of the John F. Kennedy Center for the Performing Arts since the inauguration of the project in 1964.

In the course of his return to private practice, Fortas sometimes appeared before his former colleagues at the Supreme Court. On the first occasion he did so, his successor, Harry Blackmun, recalled that his eyes met Fortas's: "[Fortas] kind of nodded ... I wondered what was going through his mind". When Blackmun later questioned Fortas if he remembered the encounter, Fortas said he would "never forget it". Blackmun thought Fortas's attitude toward the new justice was remarkable, not showing "an ounce of antagonism or resentment."

Fortas died from a ruptured aorta on April 5, 1982. His memorial service was held at the Kennedy Center with Isaac Stern and Lady Bird Johnson in attendance.

== See also ==
- Demographics of the Supreme Court of the United States
- List of justices of the Supreme Court of the United States
- List of law clerks for the second seat of the Supreme Court of the United States
- List of United States Supreme Court justices by time in office
- United States Supreme Court cases during the Warren Court

== Bibliography ==
- Johnson, Robert David (2016). "Lyndon B. Johnson and the Fortas Nomination". Journal of Supreme Court History. 41 (1): 103–122.
- Kalman, Laura (1990). Abe Fortas: A Biography. New Haven: Yale University Press. a major scholarly biography
- Krutz, Glen S., Richard Fleisher, and Jon R. Bond. "From Abe Fortas to Zoe Baird: Why some presidential nominations fail in the Senate." American Political Science Review 92.4 (1998): 871–881.
- Massaro, John. "LBJ and the Fortas Nomination for Chief Justice." Political Science Quarterly 97.4 (1982): 603–621. online
- Murphy, Bruce Allen. Fortas: The Rise and Ruin of a Supreme Court Justice (1988)

Legal offices
Preceded by Arthur Goldberg	Associate Justice of the Supreme Court of the United States; 1965–1969	Succeeded by Harry Blackmun
