= Gideon v. Wainwright =

- Supreme Court of the United States

Argued January 15, 1963 Decided March 18, 1963
- Full case name: Clarence E. Gideon v. Louie L. Wainwright, Corrections Director.
- Citations: 372 U.S. 335 (more) 83 S. Ct. 792; 9 L. Ed. 2d 799; 5951 U.S. LEXIS 1942; 23 Ohio Op. 2d 258; 93 A.L.R.2d 733
- Argument: Oral argument

Case history
- Prior: Defendant convicted, Bay County, Florida Circuit Court (1961); habeas corpus petition denied without opinion, sub. nom. Gideon v. Cochrane, 135 So. 2d 746 (Fla. 1961); certiorari granted, 370 U.S. 908 (1962).
- Subsequent: On remand, 153 So. 2d 299 (Fla. 1963); defendant acquitted, Bay County, Florida Circuit Court (1963)

Holding
- The Sixth Amendment right to counsel is a fundamental right applied to the states via the Fourteenth Amendment to the United States Constitution's Due Process Clause, and requires that indigent criminal defendants be provided counsel at trial. Supreme Court of Florida reversed.

Court membership
- Chief Justice Earl Warren Associate Justices Hugo Black · William O. Douglas; Tom C. Clark · John M. Harlan II; William J. Brennan Jr. · Potter Stewart; Byron White · Arthur Goldberg

Case opinions
- Majority: Black, joined by Warren, Douglas, Brennan, Stewart, White, Goldberg
- Concurrence: Douglas
- Concurrence: Clark (in result)
- Concurrence: Harlan

Laws applied
- U.S. Const. amends. VI, XIV
- This case overturned a previous ruling or rulings
- Betts v. Brady (1942)

Gideon v. Wainwright, 372 U.S. 335 (1963), is a landmark U.S. Supreme Court decision in which the Court fully incorporated the Sixth Amendment right to counsel provision to the states, requiring them to provide attorneys to criminal defendants who are unable to afford their own. The case extended the right to counsel, which had been found under the Fifth and Sixth Amendments to impose requirements on the federal government, by imposing those requirements upon the states as well.

The Court reasoned that the assistance of counsel is "one of the safeguards of the Sixth Amendment deemed necessary to insure fundamental human rights of life and liberty", and that the Sixth Amendment serves as a warning that "if the constitutional safeguards it provides be lost, justice will not still be done."

== Background ==
Between midnight and 8:00 a.m. on June 3, 1961, a burglary occurred at the Bay Harbor Pool Room in Panama City, Florida. An unknown person broke a door, smashed a cigarette machine and a record player, and stole money from a cash register. Later that day, a witness reported that he had seen Clarence Earl Gideon in the poolroom at around 5:30 that morning, leaving with a wine bottle, a Coca-Cola, and some change in his pockets. Based on this accusation only, the police arrested Gideon and charged him with breaking and entering with intent to commit petty larceny.

Gideon appeared in court alone, as he was too poor to afford to hire a defense lawyer. The following conversation took place between Gideon and the judge:

The COURT: Mr. Gideon, I am sorry, but I cannot appoint counsel to represent you in this case. Under the laws of the State of Florida, the only time the court can appoint counsel to represent a defendant is when that person is charged with a capital offense. I am sorry, but I will have to deny your request to appoint counsel to defend you in this case.

GIDEON: The United States Supreme Court says I am entitled to be represented by counsel.

The trial court declined to appoint counsel for Gideon. As a result, he was forced to act as his own counsel and conduct his own defense in court, emphasizing his innocence in the case. At the conclusion of the trial, the jury returned a guilty verdict. The court sentenced Gideon to serve five years in the state prison.

Gideon first filed a petition for a writ of habeas corpus in the Supreme Court of Florida. In his petition, he claimed his Sixth Amendment right had been violated because the judge refused to appoint counsel. The Florida Supreme Court denied Gideon's petition. Later, from his cell at the Florida State Prison in Raiford, making use of the prison library and writing in pencil on prison stationery, Gideon appealed to the United States Supreme Court in a suit against the Secretary of the Florida Department of Corrections, H. G. Cochran. Cochran retired and was replaced by Louie L. Wainwright before the Supreme Court heard the case. Gideon argued in his appeal that he had been denied counsel and therefore that his Sixth Amendment rights, as applied to the states by the Fourteenth Amendment, had been violated.

The Supreme Court assigned Gideon a prominent Washington, D.C. attorney, future Supreme Court justice Abe Fortas of the law firm Arnold, Fortas & Porter. Fortas was assisted by longtime Arnold, Fortas & Porter partner Abe Krash and future famed legal scholar John Hart Ely, then a third-year student at Yale Law School. Bruce Jacob, who later became Dean of the Mercer University School of Law and Dean of Stetson University College of Law, argued the case for Florida.

During oral arguments before the Supreme Court, Fortas repeatedly asserted that the existing framework for a state trial court to appoint counsel was unworkable. Under the existing framework, a magistrate in a preliminary hearing determined whether there were "special circumstances" in the case meriting that the defendant receive counsel. But as Fortas highlighted, that determination occurred too early in the case to be of any use. For example, whether a witness's statement should be barred because it was hearsay is an extremely complicated issue that no layman could readily confront, and such a situation arises only during a trial.

As a second point, Fortas presented during oral argument that it was widely accepted in the legal community that the first thing any reputable lawyer does when accused of a crime is hire an attorney. As an example, Fortas noted that when Clarence Darrow, who was widely known as the greatest criminal attorney in the United States, was charged with jury tampering and suborning perjury, the first thing he did was get an attorney to represent him. Since Gideon had only an eighth-grade education, Fortas suggested that if a lawyer as prominent as Darrow needed an attorney to represent him in criminal proceedings, then a man without a legal education, or any education for that matter, needed a lawyer too. Fortas's former Yale Law School professor, longtime friend and future Supreme Court colleague Justice William O. Douglas praised his argument as "probably the best single legal argument" in his 36 years on the court.

== Court decision ==
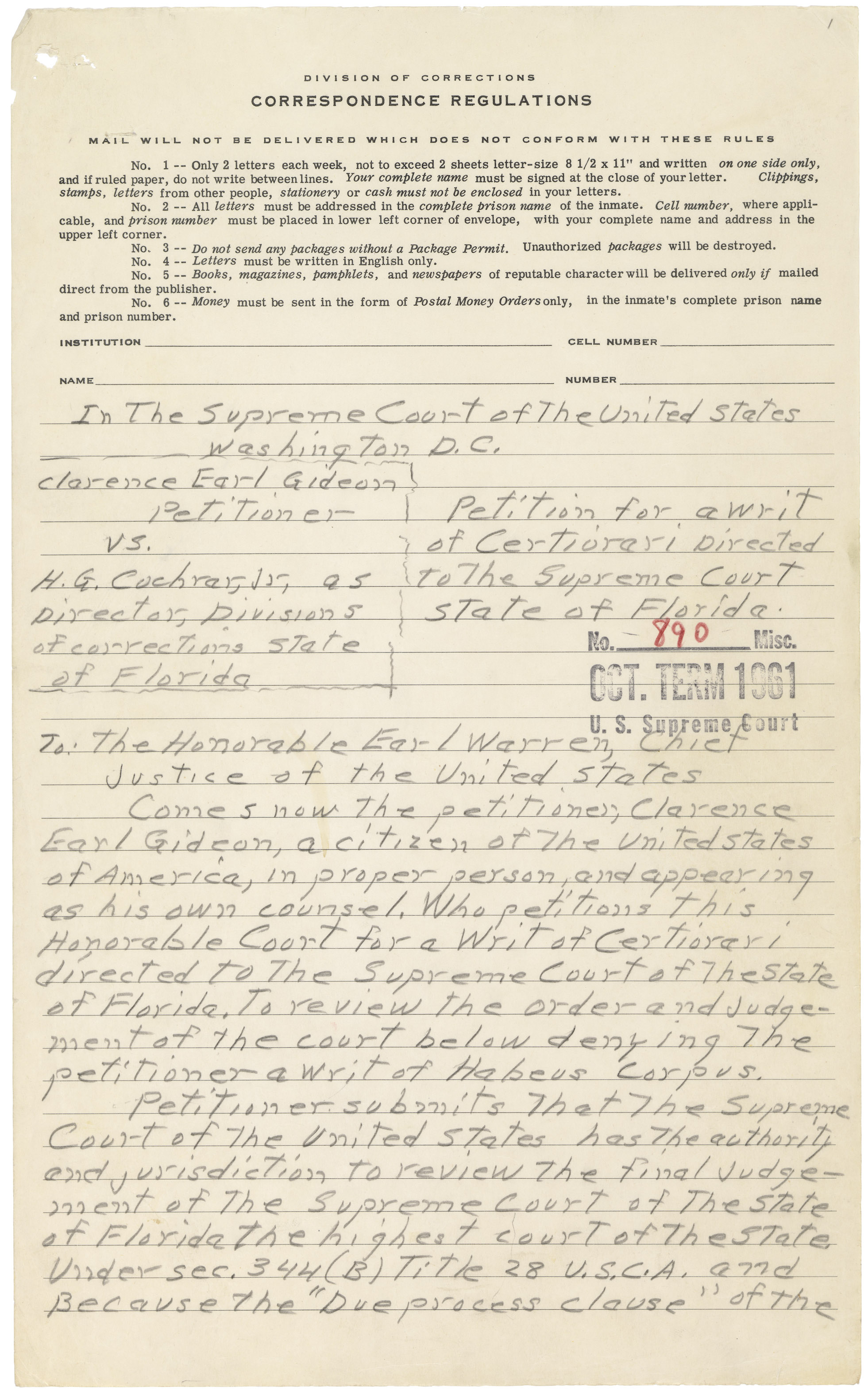
The first page of Gideon's handwritten petition for a writ of certiorari to the US Supreme Court.

The Supreme Court's decision was announced on March 18, 1963, and delivered by Justice Hugo Black. The decision was announced as being unanimous (9–0) in favor of Gideon. Two concurring opinions were written by Justices Clark and Harlan. Justice Douglas wrote a separate opinion. The Supreme Court decision specifically cited its previous ruling in Powell v. Alabama (1932). Whether the decision in Powell v. Alabama applied to non-capital cases had sparked heated debate. Betts v. Brady (1942) had earlier held that, unless certain circumstances were present, such as illiteracy or low intelligence of the defendant, or an especially complicated case, there was no need for a court-appointed attorney in state court criminal proceedings. Betts had thus provided the selective application of the Sixth Amendment right to counsel to the states, depending on the circumstances, as the Sixth Amendment had only been held binding in federal cases. Gideon overruled Betts, holding that the assistance of counsel, if desired by a defendant who could not afford to hire counsel, was a fundamental right under the United States Constitution, binding on the states, and essential for a fair trial and due process of law regardless of the circumstances of the case. For the Court, Justice Black wrote, "reason and reflection require us to recognize that in our adversary system of criminal justice, any person hauled into court, who is too poor to hire a lawyer, cannot be assured a fair trial unless counsel is provided for him", adding that the "noble ideal" of "fair trials before impartial tribunals in which every defendant stands equal before the law . . . cannot be realized if the poor man charged with crime has to face his accusers without a lawyer to assist him." The Court explained its rationale in these words:

Lawyers in criminal courts are necessities, not luxuries. The right of one charged with crime to counsel may not be deemed fundamental and essential to fair trials in some countries, but it is in ours. From the very beginning, our state and national constitutions and laws have laid great emphasis on procedural and substantive safeguards designed to assure fair trials before impartial tribunals in which every defendant stands equal before the law. This noble ideal cannot be realized if the poor man charged with crime has to face his accusers without a lawyer to assist him. A defendant's need for a lawyer is nowhere better stated than in the moving words of Mr. Justice Sutherland in Powell v. Alabama: "The right to be heard would be, in many cases, of little avail if it did not comprehend the right to be heard by counsel. Even the intelligent and educated layman has small and sometimes no skill in the science of law. If charged with crime, he is incapable, generally, of determining for himself whether the indictment is good or bad. He is unfamiliar with the rules of evidence. Left without the aid of counsel, he may be put on trial without a proper charge, and convicted upon incompetent evidence, or evidence irrelevant to the issue or otherwise inadmissible. He lacks both the skill and knowledge adequately to prepare his defense, even though he have a perfect one. He requires the guiding hand of counsel at every step in the proceedings against him. Without it, though he be not guilty, he faces the danger of conviction because he does not know how to establish his innocence."

Clark's concurring opinion stated that the Sixth Amendment does not distinguish between capital and non-capital cases, so legal counsel must be provided for an indigent defendant in all cases. Harlan's concurring opinion stated that the mere existence of a serious criminal charge in itself constituted special circumstances requiring the services of counsel at trial.

Gideon v. Wainwright was one of a series of Supreme Court decisions that confirmed the right of defendants in criminal proceedings, upon request, to have counsel appointed both during the trial and on appeal. In the subsequent cases Massiah v. United States, 377 U.S. 201 (1964), and Miranda v. Arizona 384 U.S. 436 (1966), the Supreme Court further extended the rule to apply during police interrogation.

== Implications ==
About 2,000 people were freed in Florida alone as a result of the Gideon decision. The decision did not directly result in Gideon being freed; instead, he received a new trial with the appointment of defense counsel at the government's expense.

Gideon chose W. Fred Turner to be his lawyer in his second trial. The retrial took place on August 5, 1963, five months after the Supreme Court ruling. During the trial, Turner picked apart the testimony of eyewitness Henry Cook. In his opening and closing statements, Turner suggested that Cook likely had been a lookout for a group of young men who broke into the poolroom to steal beer and then grabbed the coins while they were there. Turner also obtained a statement from a cab driver who had taken Gideon from Bay Harbor to a bar in Panama City, stating that Gideon was carrying neither wine, beer, nor Coca-Cola when he picked him up, even though Cook testified that he had watched Gideon walk from the pool hall to a payphone and then wait for a cab. This testimony completely discredited Cook.

The jury acquitted Gideon after one hour of deliberation. After his acquittal, Gideon resumed his previous life and married sometime later. He died of cancer in Fort Lauderdale on January 18, 1972, at age 61. Gideon's family in Missouri accepted his body and laid him to rest in an unmarked grave. A granite headstone was added later. It was inscribed with a quote from a letter Gideon wrote to Abe Fortas, the attorney appointed to represent him in the Supreme Court: "Each era finds an improvement in law for the benefit of mankind."

=== Impact on courts ===
The former "incorrect trial" rule, where the government was given a fair amount of latitude in criminal proceedings as long as there were no "shocking departures from fair procedure", was discarded in favor of a firm set of "procedural guarantees" based on the Constitution. The court reversed Betts and adopted rules that did not require a case-by-case application, but instead established the requirement of appointed counsel as a matter of right, without a defendant's having to show "special circumstances" that justified the appointment of counsel. In this way, the case helped to refine stare decisis: when a prior appellate court decision should be upheld and what standard should be applied to test a new case against case precedent to achieve acceptable practice and due process of law.

==== Public defender system ====
Many changes have been made in the prosecution and legal representation of indigent defendants since the Gideon decision. The decision created and then expanded the need for public defenders, which had previously been rare. For example, immediately following the decision, Florida required public defenders in all of its circuit courts.

The need for more public defenders also led to a need to ensure that they were properly trained in criminal defense, in order to allow defendants to receive as fair a trial as possible. Several states and counties followed suit. Washington, D.C., for instance, has created a training program for their public defenders, who must receive rigorous training before they are allowed to represent defendants, and must continue their training in order to remain current in criminal law, procedure, and practices. In 2010, a public defender's office in the South Bronx, The Bronx Defenders, created the Center for Holistic Defense, which has helped many state public defender offices and developed a model of public defense called holistic defense or holistic advocacy. In it, criminal defense attorneys work on interdisciplinary teams, alongside civil attorneys, social workers, and legal advocates to help clients with not only direct but also collateral aspects of their criminal cases. More recently the American Bar Association and the National Legal Aid and Defender Association have set minimum training requirements, caseload levels, and experience requirements for defenders.

There is often controversy about whether public defenders' caseloads give them enough time to defend their clients adequately. Some criticize public defenders for encouraging their clients to plead guilty. Some defenders say this is intended to lessen their own workload, while others say it is intended to obtain a lighter sentence by negotiating a plea bargain as compared with going to trial and risking a harsher sentence. Tanya Greene, an ACLU lawyer, has said that that is why 90% to 95% of defendants plead guilty: "You've got so many cases, limited resources, and there's no relief. You go to work, you get more cases. You have to triage."

=== Cause of the civil right to counsel movement ===
Gideon v. Wainwright marked a key transition in legal aid in the United States. Before Gideon, civil litigants were able to access counsel only based on the following three stringent criteria: whether the case had implications for a private corporation; whether their not receiving counsel would render the trial unfair or in some way compromised in procedure; and whether the case affected the government's interests.

After Gideon, and amid growing concern about the paucity of resources for poverty lawyering and the resource burden of case-by-case counsel determinations, state judges and legislators saw the benefit of ensuring the right to counsel for civil litigants just as Gideon provided for criminal defendants. Additionally, an influential 1997 article by a federal district court judge helped revitalize the conversation about the need and justification for a right to counsel in civil cases.

In contrast to the self-representation movement, the historical civil right to counsel movement was founded on the premise that systemic representation by counsel "ensures more accurate outcomes in civil cases". Proponents of the movement also argue that a right to counsel "saves federal and state government money by helping to avoid the negative externalities caused by litigants wrongly losing their civil cases (such as increased use of shelters, emergency medical care, foster care, police, and public benefits), and increases the public's faith and investment in the judicial process".

While the movement has gained substantial traction over time (for instance, 18 jurisdictions enacted a right to counsel for tenants facing eviction between 2017 and 2022), some of its opponents have argued that it places an unreasonable financial burden on states that have an inadequate understanding of the costs and resources needed for civil counsel. Others argue that the right may lead to constitutionally inadequate representation, as has happened in criminal cases. One judge said that, post-Gideon, "many defendants were represented only by 'walking violations of the Sixth Amendment' [...] No constitutional right is celebrated so much in the abstract and observed so little in reality as the right to counsel". Since publicly financed counsel is not supported financially by the client, there is no guarantee that the appointed counsel will be adequately trained and experienced in the legal domain they are representing.

==== Civil right to counsel: influence on policy and aid provision ====
The movement along with the strong correlation between representation and equitable outcomes for low-income litigants in poverty lawyership scholarship has significantly influenced the policies surrounding legal representation. For example, in 2006, the American Bar Association adopted Resolution 112A, urging jurisdictions to provide legal counsel "as a matter of right at public expense to low-income persons in those categories of adversarial proceedings where basic human needs are at stake". Outside of influencing policy, the civil right to counsel movement has fueled approaches to legal aid that aim to alleviate the financial burden civil litigants face. Aid through lawyer substitutes has become more prevalent, involving non-lawyer professionals who can assist clients in legal matters without the supervision of a certified attorney. Similarly, pro bono legal aid, which involves providing legal services without fees in order to promote public good, has gained prominence.

=== Waiving the right to counsel ===
Doughty v. Maxwell demonstrates the differences between how states and the federal government address standards for waiver of the right to counsel. In this case, the Supreme Court granted certiorari and reversed the decision of the Ohio court in Doughty, which held that regardless of Gideon, the defendant waived their right to appointed counsel by entering a plea of guilty. The underlying alleged crime and trial in Doughty took place in Ohio, which had its own way of interpreting the right to counsel, as do many states. Pennsylvania and West Virginia also deemed that the right to counsel was waived when a plea of guilty was entered. Depending upon one's viewpoint, rules such as these could be seen as an attempt by a state to establish reasonable rules in criminal cases or as an attempt to save money even at the expense of denying a defendant due process. This varies a great deal from federal law, which generally has stricter guidelines for waiving the right to counsel. An analogous area of criminal law is the circumstances under which a criminal defendant can waive the right to trial. Under federal law, the defendant can only waive their right to trial if it is clear that the defendant understands the "charges, the consequences of the various pleas, and the availability of counsel". State laws on the subject are often less strict, making it easier for prosecutors to obtain a defendant's waiver of the right to trial.

== Criticism ==
In Garza v. Idaho, Justice Clarence Thomas, joined by Justice Neil Gorsuch, filed a dissenting opinion suggesting Gideon was wrongly decided and should be overruled. Justice Samuel Alito joined part of the dissent, but did not join the call to overturn Gideon.

== See also ==
- Gideon's Trumpet, 1964 book about the case, and its film adaptation
