= Betts v. Brady =

- Supreme Court of the United States

Argued April 13–14, 1942 Decided June 1, 1942
- Full case name: Betts v. Brady
- Citations: 316 U.S. 455 (more) 62 S. Ct. 1252; 86 L. Ed. 1595; 1942 U.S. LEXIS 489

Case history
- Prior: None

Holding
- Where a man is tried for robbery, due process of law does not demand that Maryland furnish counsel to an indigent defendant.

Court membership
- Chief Justice Harlan F. Stone Associate Justices Owen Roberts · Hugo Black; Stanley F. Reed · Felix Frankfurter; William O. Douglas · Frank Murphy; James F. Byrnes · Robert H. Jackson

Case opinions
- Majority: Roberts, joined by Stone, Reed, Frankfurter, Byrnes, Jackson
- Dissent: Black, joined by Douglas, Murphy

Laws applied
- U.S. Const. amends. VI, XIV
- Overruled by
- Gideon v. Wainwright (1963)

Betts v. Brady, 316 U.S. 455 (1942), was a landmark United States Supreme Court case that denied counsel to indigent defendants prosecuted by a state. The reinforcement that such a case is not to be reckoned as denial of fundamental due process was overruled by Gideon v. Wainwright. In the dissent, Justice Hugo Black opined that "A practice cannot be reconciled with 'common and fundamental ideas of fairness and right' which subjects innocent men to increased dangers of conviction merely because of their poverty."

== Background ==
In its decision in Johnson v. Zerbst, the Supreme Court had held that defendants in federal courts had a right to counsel guaranteed by the Sixth Amendment. In Powell v. Alabama, the Court had held that state defendants in capital cases were entitled to counsel, even when they could not afford it; however, the right to an attorney in trials in the states did not yet extend to all cases as it did in federal courts under Johnson v. Zerbst. In Betts v. Brady, Betts was indicted for robbery and upon his request for counsel, the trial judge refused, forcing Betts to represent himself. He was convicted of robbery, a conviction he eventually appealed to the Supreme Court on the basis that he was being held unlawfully because he had been denied counsel.

Betts filed writ of habeas corpus at the Circuit Court for Washington County, Maryland, and claimed that he had been denied counsel. He then filed a petition for writ of certiorari to the Court of Appeals of Maryland, the state's ultimate appellate court. All of his petitions were denied. Finally, he filed for certiorari to the Supreme Court.

== Issue ==
In a 6–3 decision, the Court found that Betts did not have the right to be appointed counsel with Justice Hugo Black emphatically dissenting. In the majority opinion, Justice Owen Roberts stated,

The Fourteenth Amendment prohibits the conviction and incarceration of one whose trial is offensive to the common and fundamental ideas of fairness and right, and while want of counsel in a particular case may result in a conviction lacking in such fundamental fairness, we cannot say that the amendment embodies an inexorable command that no trial for any offense, or in any court, can be fairly conducted and justice accorded a defendant who is not represented by counsel.

Throughout the opinion, Roberts continually makes the point that not all defendants in all cases will need the assistance of counsel in order to receive a fair trial with due process. Roberts appears to be of the opinion that while counsel may be necessary to receive a fair trial in some cases, it is not necessary in all cases. However, in his dissent, Black wrote:

A practice cannot be reconciled with 'common and fundamental ideas of fairness and right,' which subjects innocent men to increased dangers of conviction merely because of their poverty. Whether a man is innocent cannot be determined from a trial in which, as here, denial of counsel has made it impossible to conclude, with any satisfactory degree of certainty, that the defendant's case was adequately presented.

Black stated in his dissent that the denial of counsel based on financial stability makes it that those in poverty have an increased chance of conviction, which is not equal protection of the laws under the Fourteenth Amendment. During his dissent, Black also cited Johnson v. Zerbst and made the point that had the proceedings of Betts's case been held in federal court, his petition for counsel to be appointed to him would have been accepted, and counsel would have been appointed. Black argued that because this right was guaranteed in federal courts, the Fourteenth Amendment should make the right obligatory upon the states, but the majority disagreed. Black argued also that a man of even average intelligence could not possibly be expected to represent himself without any training in such matters as the law.

== See also ==
- List of United States Supreme Court cases, volume 316
