= Platoon Leader =

Platoon Leader may refer to:

- Platoon leader, the officer in charge of a platoon
- Platoon Leader (memoir), a 1985 memoir by James R. McDonough
- Platoon Leader (film), a 1988 film, based on the memoir
