= Platoon leader =

Military occupation, commander of a platoon, typically an officer

Standard NATO military map symbol for a friendly infantry platoon.

A platoon leader (NATO) or platoon commander (more common in Commonwealth militaries and the US Marine Corps) is the officer in charge of a platoon. This person is usually a junior officer – a second lieutenant or first lieutenant or an equivalent rank. The officer is usually assisted by a platoon sergeant. Some special units, such as specific aviation platoons and special forces, require a captain as platoon leader, due to the nature and increased responsibility of such assignments. Platoons normally consist of three or four sections (Commonwealth) or squads (US).

== Responsibilities of a Platoon Leader ==
The duties and responsibilities of a platoon leader is similar in the armies. Based on the US Army publications, it is possible to address that a platoon leader:

- Leads the platoon in supporting the higher headquarters missions. He bases his actions on his assigned mission and intent and concept of his higher commanders.
- Conducts troop leading procedures.
- Maneuvers squads and fighting elements.
- Synchronizes the efforts of squads.
- Looks ahead to the next “move" of the platoon.
- Requests, controls, and synchronizes supporting assets.
- Employs mission command systems available to the squads and platoon.
- Checks with squad leaders ensuring 360-degree, three-dimensional security is maintained.
- Checks with weapons squad leader controlling the emplacement of key weapon systems.
- Issues accurate and timely reports.
- Places himself where he is most needed to accomplish the mission.
- Assigns clear tasks and purposes to the squads.
- Understands the mission and commander’s intent two levels up (company and battalion).
- Receives on-hand status reports from the platoon sergeant, section leaders, and squad leaders during planning.
- Coordinates and assists in the development of the obstacle plan.
- Oversees and is responsible for property management

In Mechanized infantry units, also, the platoon leader:

- Normally dismounts when the situation causes the platoon to dismount.
- Serves as Armoured personnel carrier or Infantry fighting vehicle commander when mounted.
- Develops the fires with the platoon sergeant, section leaders, and squad leaders.

== Military rank ==
=== NATO code ===
While the rank is used in some NATO countries, it is ranked differently depending on the country.

NATO code	Country	English equivalent	
NATO code	Country	UK	US
OR-7	Romania	Staff sergeant	Sergeant first class
OR-3	Poland	Lance corporal	Private first class

=== Use ===
Rank	First platoon adjutant	Platoon adjutant	Platoon major	Platoon leader
Moldovan Ground Forces
Moldovan Ground Forces		Plutonier-adjutant	Plutonier-major	Plutonier
Polish Land Forces
Polish Land Forces				Plutonowy
Romanian Land Forces
Romanian Land Forces	Plutonier adjutant principal	Plutonier adjutant	Plutonier-major	Plutonier

== See also ==
- Crew chief (disambiguation)
- Team leader
- Squad leader
- Platoon Leader (film)
- Platoon Leader (memoir)
- Platoon Leaders Class
