= Ricky D. Dixon =

American correctional officer

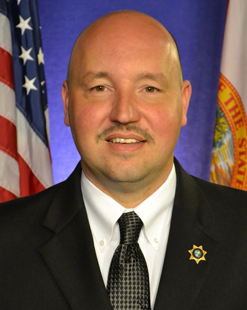
- Dixon in 2021

Secretary of the Florida Department of Corrections
- In office November 19, 2021 – June 30, 2026
- Appointed by: Ron DeSantis
- Preceded by: Mark S. Inch
- Succeeded by: Richard Comerford

President of the American Correctional Association
- Incumbent
- Assumed office January 12, 2025
- Preceded by: Denise M. Robinson

Personal details
- Education: Florida Gulf Coast University (BA)

Ricky D. Dixon is an American correctional officer who was appointed Secretary of the Florida Department of Corrections on November 19, 2021. Governor Ron DeSantis appointed him to replace retiring Secretary Mark S. Inch. On June 30, 2026, Dixon retired as Secretary after 30 years of service with the department.

Dixon earned a Bachelor of Arts degree in criminology from Florida Gulf Coast University in 2000. He also graduated from the Florida Department of Law Enforcement's Executive Seminar. Dixon began his career at Lancaster Correctional Institution in 1996, where he worked as a Correctional Officer. Throughout his early career, Dixon served as Correctional Officer Colonel of Florida State Prison, Assistant Warden at Martin and Okeechobee Correctional Institutions, and Warden at three correctional institutions in the state.

Dixon also served as Deputy Secretary for four years and was responsible for the operation of the agency. In this position, Dixon oversaw the largest evacuation of inmates in the U.S. during Hurricane Irma and established Florida as a national leader in hurricane response.

Additionally, Dixon served as the Deputy Assistant Secretary of Institutions for four years, and was responsible for the administration and management of the Department's 50 major correctional institutions and their associated facilities.

Dixon is nationally recognized by the American Correctional Association and the National Institute of Corrections as an expert in corrections. He holds membership and affiliations with the American Correctional Association, National Institute of Corrections, Correctional Leaders of America, Florida Sheriff's Association, Florida Police Chiefs, Florida Council on Crime and Delinquency, the Correctional Officer's Foundation and the Correctional Peace Officers Foundation. On January 12, 2025, Dixon was sworn in as President of the American Correctional Association.
