= James R. McDonough =

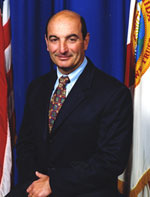

Secretary of the Florida Department of Corrections
- In office June 29, 2006—January 15, 2008
- Appointed by: Governor Jeb Bush
- Preceded by: James V. Crosby
- Succeeded by: Walter A. McNeil

Interim Secretary of the Florida Department of Corrections
- In office February 10, 2006—June 29, 2006
- Appointed by: Governor Jeb Bush

Director of Strategy for the Office of National Drug Control Policy
- In office 1996—1999
- Appointed by: President Bill Clinton

Personal details
- Education: Massachusetts Institute of Technology, West Point, United States Military Academy

Military service
- Branch/service: U.S. Army
- Rank: Colonel
- Military Awards: Defense Service Medal Two Legions of Merit Three Bronze Stars Purple Heart

James R. McDonough is an American former military officer and civil servant. He was the Secretary of the Florida Department of Corrections from February 10, 2006, to January 15, 2008. Florida Governor Jeb Bush appointed McDonough after Secretary Jimmy V. Crosby resigned amidst a corruption scandal.

== Early life and education ==
McDonough attended the Massachusetts Institute of Technology in addition to the United States Military Academy at West Point, New York, where he graduated in 1969. He met his wife, Pat, there and they married four days after their graduation.

== Career ==
McDonough had an extensive military career, including assignments in Africa and the Balkans. He was awarded three Bronze Stars (one for valor), the Purple Heart, and the Distinguished Service Medal, among other honors.

Before serving as Secretary of the Department of Corrections, McDonough served as the Director of the Governor's Office of Drug Control under Governor Jeb Bush, as well as Florida's only drugs czar for seven years. Between 1996 and 1999, he served as the Director of Strategy for the Office of National Drug Control Policy under President Bill Clinton. He also served as an associate professor of political science and international affairs at the U.S. Military Academy, as an analyst with the Defense Nuclear Agency, and as a detailee with the U.S. State Department.

When McDonough became Secretary of the Florida Department of Corrections, he began firing individuals involved with the scandal that led to the resignation of former Secretary Jimmy Crosby and aimed to restore trust in Florida's correctional system. Among his reforms include the firing of nine top officials on the same day, implementing a code of conduct for all employees, and requiring random drug tests for most prison employees.

McDonough had a no-tolerance policy for corruption and worked to clean up the department and its reputation. Commenting on the actions of former Secretary Jimmy Crosby, McDonough stated, "What he did was despicable. It was heinous. He talked of shame." He continued to root out corruption and in 2007, amidst an alleged prisoner 'beating party' at Hendry Correctional Institution, McDonough fired 20 officials involved.

He is the author of several books, including Platoon Leader, a memoir about his experience in the Vietnam War, which was also loosely adapted into movie with the same name.
