= Sargus Juvenile Detention Center =

Juvenile detention center in Ohio

Coordinates: 40°4′36″N 80°57′56″W

Sargus Juvenile Detention Center is one of seven juvenile detention centers in the U.S. state of Ohio. Named after Judge Edmund A. Sargus, a former juvenile court judge of Belmont County, it is located just outside St. Clairsville, Ohio. The rated bed capacity is 17, but up to 24 youths are detained in the facility on any given day. It was established in 1973.

It is currently directed by Beth A. Oprisch, who obtained the position in 1995. She has stated on the site listed that "Our job is to keep kids safe. We also try to be true to the mission of the juvenile justice system to rehabilitate youth. We feel this is best accomplished by holding them accountable for their behavior and treating them with respect and dignity."

The center has been in operation for 34 years and is currently seeking maintenance grants from Belmont County.

The impetus for the center followed the untimely death of Judge Edmund A. Sargus on March 4, 1967, only four weeks after he became a judge. The day before his death, he toured the Belmont County Jail with the County Commissioners. He advised the Commissioners that he would not incarcerate juveniles in a jail housing adults in a general lockup environment. After his death, local citizens raised funds to begin the Center, which was the first multi-county juvenile detention facility in Ohio.

One of the first employees of the center was Kathleen Hawk, who later became the Director of the Federal Bureau of Prisons, the largest prison system in the country.
