= Charles Samuels =

Charles Samuels may refer to:

- Charles Samuels (writer) (1902–1982), American journalist and writer
- Charles E. Samuels Jr. (born 1966), American correctional officer and director of the Federal Bureau of Prisons
- Charles Samuels (maroon) (died c. early 1800s), maroon officer from Cudjoe's Town (Trelawny Town), Jamaica
- Charles Samuels (athlete) (1863/1864–1912), Aboriginal Australian athlete

== See also ==
- Charles Samuel (1862–1938), Belgian sculptor, engraver and medalist
