= Richard L. Dugger =

American politician (1943–2015)

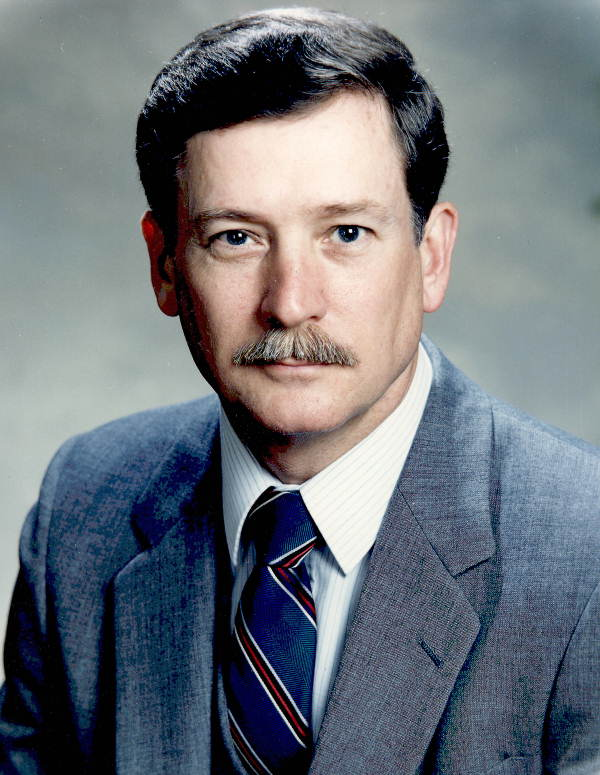

Secretary of the Florida Department of Corrections
- In office 1987-1991
- Preceded by: Louie L. Wainwright
- Succeeded by: Harry K. Singletary

Personal details
- Born: January 25, 1943 Jacksonville, Florida
- Died: August 20, 2015 (aged 72) Tallahassee, Florida

Military service
- Branch/service: U.S. Army
- Years of service: 1966-1995
- Rank: Sergeant Major
- Unit: 20th Special Forces

Richard L. Dugger (January 25, 1943 – August 20, 2015) was secretary of the Florida Department of Corrections from 1987 to 1991, when Harry K. Singletary, Jr. took over. He then served as warden of Hamilton Correctional Institution from 1992 to 1998.

Dugger was warden of Florida State Prison from 1982 to 1987, when he was appointed Secretary of the Department of Corrections by then Florida governor Bob Martinez. During his tenure, the department started a large campaign to combat prison overcrowding.

In 1999, Dugger was appointed deputy director of institutions for the Florida Department of Corrections, replacing Stan Czerniak. A year later, he was appointed director of institutions for the Florida Department of Corrections.

Dugger was born in Jacksonville, Florida, on January 25, 1943, and resided in Raiford, Florida, until graduation from Bradford County High School in 1961. In his words, he became a "college drop-out" in 1964 and began his career with the Florida Department of Corrections as a correctional officer at Florida State Prison, East Unit. In 1966, he enlisted in the U.S. Army, 20th Special Forces, to begin a military career lasting 20 years.

Dugger retired after a 30-year career in 1995. He returned to work for the Department of Corrections serving in various positions from 1999 to 2005 and again from 2006 to 2007.

Dugger was equally proud of his military career. He had many stories about parachuting into various countries around the world. He was most proud of completing the Army Combat Diver Program in his 40s. He retired from the Army at the rank of sergeant major. He died at the age of 72 in Tallahassee, Florida, on August 20, 2015.
