= Louie L. Wainwright =

Secretary of the Florida Division of Corrections (1923–2021)

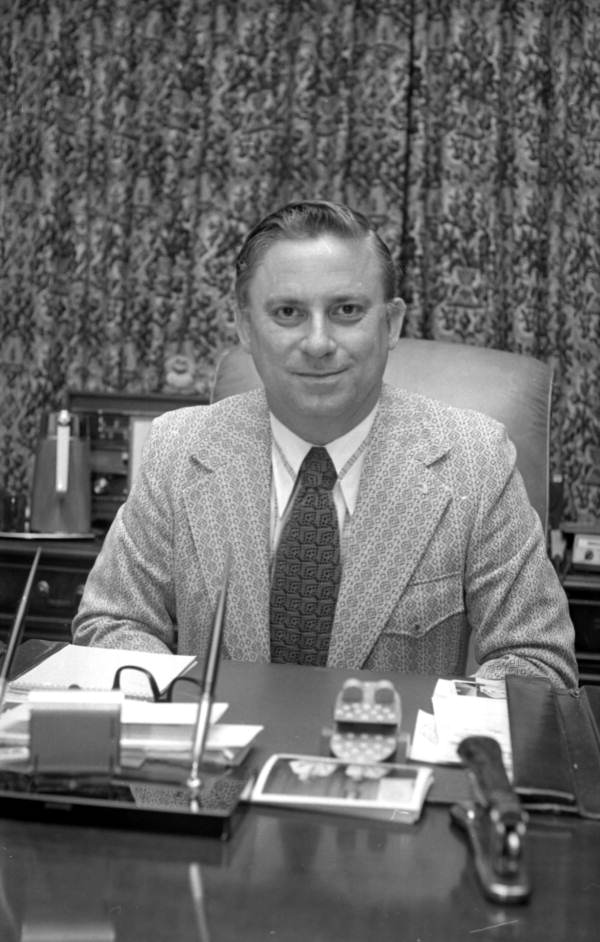
- Wainwright in 1973

Secretary of the Florida Department of Corrections
- In office 1962–1987
- Preceded by: H. G. Cochran
- Succeeded by: Richard L. Dugger

Personal details
- Born: September 11, 1923 Lawtey, Florida, U.S.
- Died: December 23, 2021 (aged 98) Tallahassee, Florida, U.S.
- Resting place: Kingsley Lake Cemetery Clay County, Florida, USA
- Spouse(s): Edna Edwards (died 1998); Anabel Peacock (died 2019)
- Children: Louie Wainwright Jr. (died 2013); Michael Wainwright; Sherry Wainwright
- Education: Nova Southeastern University

Louie Lee Wainwright (September 11, 1923 – December 23, 2021) was an American corrections administrator who served as Secretary of the Florida Department of Corrections from 1962 to 1987. He is known for having been the named respondent in two U.S. Supreme Court cases: Gideon v. Wainwright in which indigents are guaranteed an attorney, and Ford v. Wainwright, in which the Court approved the common law rule prohibiting the execution of the insane. Time called the Gideon decision one of the ten most important legal events of the 1960s. He also appeared as the respondent in a number of habeas corpus petitions that reached the Supreme Court level during his tenure in office, making "Wainwright" one of the most familiar names to students of habeas corpus law.

== Biography ==
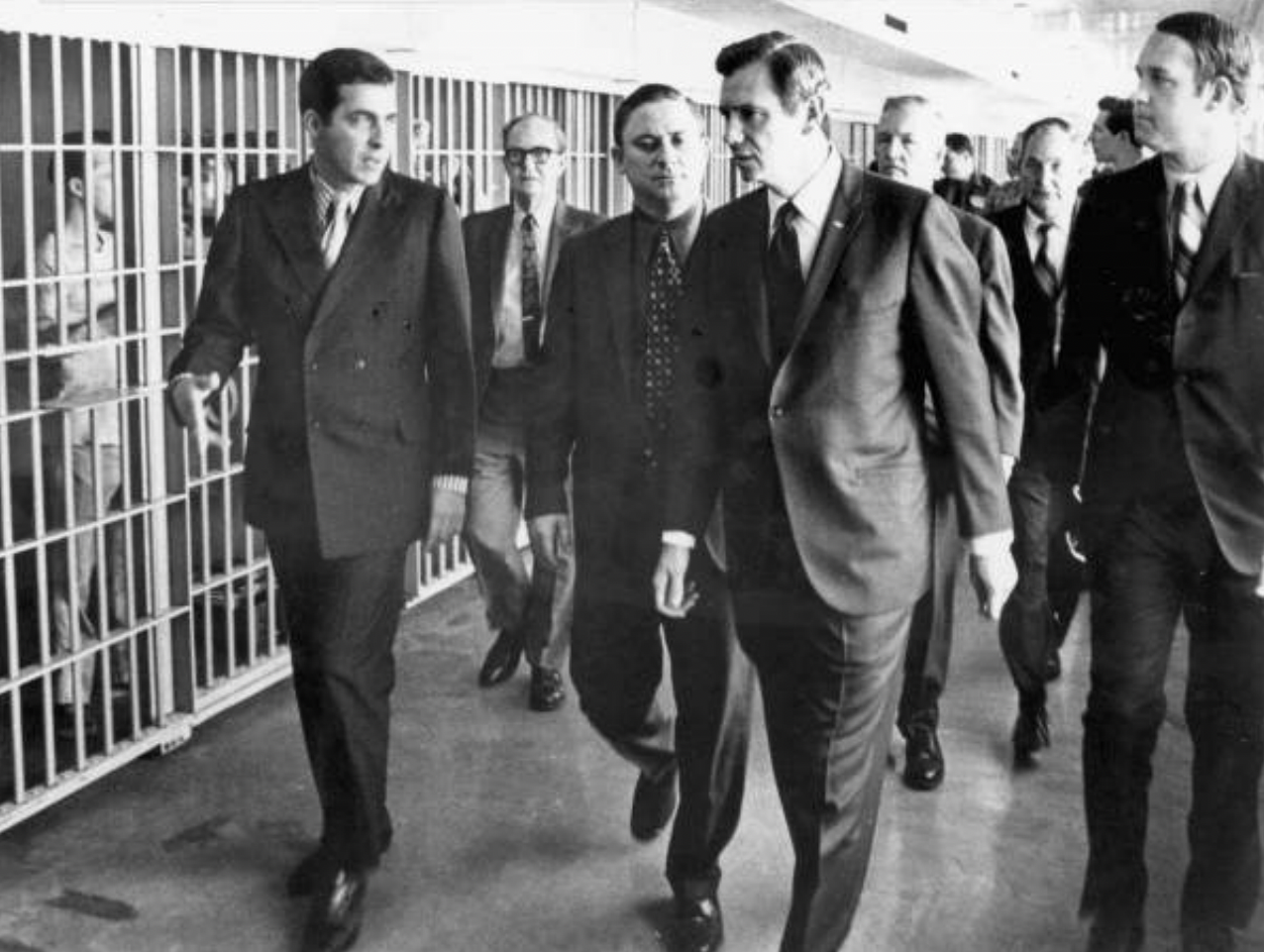
Governor Reubin Askew (center foreground) listens to Dr. James Bax, state Director of Rehabilitative Services, (left) as the governor's inspection party walks through "death row" at Raiford Prison. Between the two men is Louis Wainwright Corrections Director.

Born in Lawtey, Florida, Wainwright received a master's degree in criminal justice from Nova Southeastern University, later serving as a temporary faculty member there. He was then acknowledged as dean of American Correctional Administrators. Wainwright was appointed secretary of the Florida Division of Corrections by Cecil Farris Bryant (Florida Governor at that time) in 1962, replacing H. G. Cochran and remained in the position until 1987, when Richard L. Dugger assumed the role.

Wainwright served under six governors: C. Farris Bryant, Haydon Burns, Claude Roy Kirk, Jr., Reubin Askew, Bob Graham, and Wayne Mixson.

He received the American Correctional Association's highest tribute, the E.R. Cass Award, for outstanding service, and his efforts in support of accreditation in Florida and nationwide earned him the 1986 Accreditation Achievement Award from the Commission of Accreditation for Corrections. Wainwright was appointed to the Corrections Foundation Board in 2001 and re-appointed president in 2003 and annually through 2016.

He also served as president of the Florida Peace Officers' Association from 1965 to 1966, where he was still a prominent and respected member. He was once the superintendent of Avon Park Correctional Institution. His post, Secretary of the Florida Division of Corrections, replaced the post of Director of the Division of Corrections.

Wainwright died in Tallahassee, Florida, on December 23, 2021, at the age of 98.

== See also ==
- Wainwright v. Greenfield
- Ford v. Wainwright
- Gideon v. Wainwright
