= James V. Crosby =

American state official (born 1952)

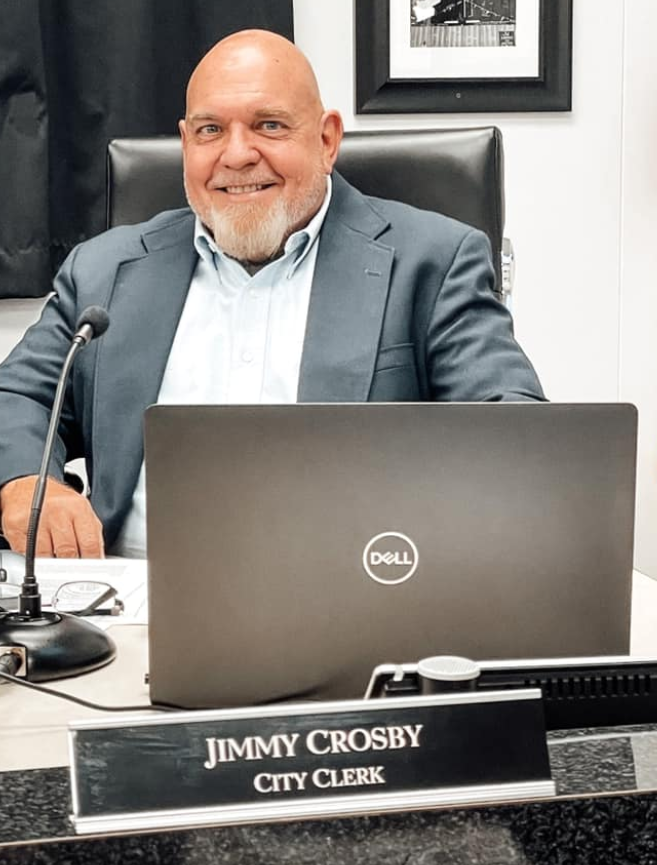

Secretary of the Florida Department of Corrections
- Preceded by: Michael W. Moore
- Succeeded by: James R. McDonough
- In office January 7, 2003 – February 10, 2006

City Clerk for Starke, Florida
- In office October 2021 – March 5, 2024

Personal details
- Born: August 15, 1952 (age 74) Starke, Florida
- Education: University of Florida, Jacksonville Baptist Theological Seminary

James V. “Jimmy” Crosby Jr. (born 1952) is the former Secretary of the Florida Department of Corrections. He was appointed by Florida Governor Jeb Bush in 2003.

== Early life and education ==
Jimmy Crosby was born and raised in Starke, Florida on August 15, 1952. He attended Bradford County High School in one of the first desegregated graduating classes at the school. Crosby earned his Bachelor of Arts, Communication and Journalism, from the University of Florida, class of 1973 and early in his career became a City Commissioner and later Mayor of the City of Starke by the age of 28. Between 2008 and 2010, Crosby obtained a Master of Theology, Doctorate of Ministry, Doctorate of Theology, Doctorate of Philosophy in Biblical Studies from the Jacksonville Baptist Theological Seminary. Crosby is also a certified public manager.

== Career ==
Crosby joined the Florida Department of Corrections in 1975 and served as the warden at five major institutions, including Florida State Prison. He also served as Regional Director of Security and Institutional Management, Region II. He replaced George Denman as Region II director in 2001.

Crosby was heavily involved in Republican Party politics during his career, serving at one time as a congressional district chairman. He was instrumental in the North Florida campaign for Jeb Bush's successful race for Governor of Florida.

In 2003, Crosby was appointed by Florida Governor Jeb Bush as Secretary of the Department of Corrections, overseeing a budget of $2 billion.

On February 10, 2006, Crosby resigned as Secretary of the Florida Department of Corrections at the request of Governor Bush.

On July 5, 2006, it was reported that Crosby would plead guilty to accepting $130,000 in kickbacks over a two and a half year period. Two law enforcement officials close to the case also said that new charges were expected against almost a dozen current and former prison employees.

Governor Bush named James R. McDonough, Col. (ret) as interim secretary before he was given the job on a permanent basis.

Crosby served an eight-year prison sentence at FCI Morgantown, a Federal Prison in West Virginia. He was released on April 11, 2013.

In August 2015, Crosby became President of the Jacksonville Baptist Theological Seminary.

In October 2021, Crosby bergan to serve as the elected City Clerk of his hometown of Starke, Florida.

On March 5, 2024, WCBJ (News 20) reported Crosby resigned after the Florida Department of Law Enforcement conduced a raid of the Stake City Hall as part of an investigation into election issues. He was placed on paid administrative leave following an investigation by the city into the fact he was not able to run for public office being a convicted felon.
