= Wainwright v. Greenfield =

- Supreme Court of the United States

Argued November 13, 1985 Decided January 14, 1986
- Full case name: Louie L. Wainwright, Secretary, Florida Department of Corrections v. Greenfield
- Citations: 474 U.S. 284 (more) 106 S. Ct. 634; 88 L. Ed. 2d 623; 1986 U.S. LEXIS 41

Holding
- The prosecutor's use of respondent's postarrest, post-Miranda warnings silence as evidence of sanity violated the Due Process Clause of the Fourteenth Amendment.

Court membership
- Chief Justice Warren E. Burger Associate Justices William J. Brennan Jr. · Byron White; Thurgood Marshall · Harry Blackmun; Lewis F. Powell Jr. · William Rehnquist; John P. Stevens · Sandra Day O'Connor

Case opinions
- Majority: Stevens, joined by Brennan, White, Marshall, Blackmun, Powell, O'Connor
- Concurrence: Rehnquist, joined by Burger

Laws applied
- U.S. Const. amend. XIV

Wainwright v. Greenfield, 474 U.S. 284 (1986), is a case in which the United States Supreme Court reversed the lower court's finding and overturned the petitioner's conviction, on the grounds that it was fundamentally unfair for the prosecutor to comment during the court proceedings on the petitioner's silence invoked as a result of a Miranda warning.

== Background ==
After his arrest in Florida for sexual battery, Greenfield was given three separate Miranda warnings. Each time, he exercised his right to remain silent and requested to speak with an attorney before answering questions. At his trial in the Circuit Court for Sarasota County, the respondent pleaded not guilty by reason of insanity. During closing arguments in the Florida trial court, the prosecutor reviewed the police officer's testimony, over defense counsel's objection, arguing that Greenfield's silence after receiving Miranda warnings was evidence of his sanity. The testimony described the occasions when respondent had exercised his right to remain silent. The prosecutor suggested that respondent's repeated refusals to answer questions without first consulting an attorney "demonstrated a degree of comprehension that was inconsistent with his claim of insanity".

Greenfield then unsuccessfully sought habeas corpus relief in Federal District Court, by suing the Florida Department of Corrections and its secretary, Louie L. Wainwright, arguing that the prosecutor's use of his silence violated the Due Process Clause of the Fourteenth Amendment as construed in Doyle v. Ohio (1976). The court affirmed the conviction, holding that the general rule precluding a prosecutor from commenting on a defendant's exercise of his right to remain silent did not apply to a case in which an insanity plea was filed.

== Decision ==
The Court held that the prosecutor's use of respondent's post-arrest, post-Miranda warnings silence as evidence of sanity violated the Due Process Clause of the Fourteenth Amendment.

== See also ==
- List of United States Supreme Court cases, volume 474
