= Michael W. Moore =

Former secretary of the Florida Department of Corrections

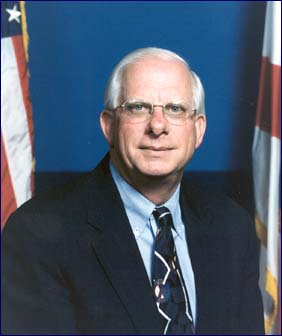

Secretary of the Florida Department of Corrections
- In office January 5, 1999—January 6, 2003
- Preceded by: Harry K. Singletary
- Succeeded by: James V. Crosby

Personal details
- Born: August 30, 1948 (age 78) Houston, Texas
- Education: Sam Houston State University

Military service
- Branch/service: U.S. Army

Michael W. Moore
- Born: 30 August 1948 (age 78); Houston, Texas, U.S.
- Occupations: Prison officer and warden

Michael W. Moore (born 30 August 1948, Houston, Texas) is the former Secretary of the Florida Department of Corrections. Moore was appointed to the position by Governor Jeb Bush on January 5, 1999.

Moore earned a Bachelor's Degree in Criminology and Corrections from Sam Houston State University in 1976. He worked for more than two decades in the Texas Department of Criminal Justice where he rose from a correctional officer in 1967 to regional director in 1985. During his Texas tenure, Moore also served as a personnel and training lieutenant, industrial supervisor, lieutenant, captain, and major of correctional officers, as well as warden of a maximum-security prison. He served as regional director for ten years from 1985 before he joined the South Carolina system.

Moore was director of the South Carolina Department of Corrections from 1995 to 1999. He imposed policies including a strict grooming policy that lead to a prison uprising and an unsuccessful lawsuit against him. On 5 January 1999 he was appointed Secretary of the Florida Department of Corrections by Florida governor Jeb Bush. In 2003, James V. Crosby Jr. took over.
