= Harry K. Singletary =

Harry K. Singletary Jr.

Secretary of the Florida Department of Corrections
- In office April 12, 1991 – January 4, 1999
- Preceded by: Richard L. Dugger
- Succeeded by: Michael W. Moore

Personal details
- Born: March 6, 1946 Tarpon Springs, Florida
- Died: January 29, 2010 (aged 63)
- Spouse: Vivian E. Jenkins
- Education: Florida Presbyterian College, University of Chicago

Harry K. Singletary Jr. (March 6, 1946 – January 29, 2010) was an American corrections administrator who served as Secretary of the Florida Department of Corrections from 1991 to 1999. Singletary was the first African-American Secretary of the Florida Department of Corrections.

== Biography ==
=== Personal life ===
Singletary was born in Tarpon Springs, Florida to a maid and an orange-grove worker. He was the first African-American to graduate from Florida Presbyterian College, where he earned a B.A. degree in Sociology in. In 1971, Singletary earned a master's degree in Social Services Administration from the University of Chicago.

Singletary grew up playing basketball and earned the nickname "The Spring" among his peers. He participated in the 1968 NBA draft, and was the 8th pick, 142nd overall in the 11th round for the Los Angeles Lakers. Singletary was also drafted by the Dallas Chaparrals of the old American Basketball Association.

Singletary was married to Kimberly DeLaney Singletary with whom he had three children and five grandchildren. He was a member of the Timberlane Church of Christ and Paul Russell Road Church of Christ for 11 and 5 years, respectively.

Singletary died on January 29, 2010, from complications of Hodgkins lymphoma at the age of 63.

=== Professional career ===
Singletary began his career working with juveniles in Illinois in 1968. In 1979, Singletary became the Regional Director for Region V of the Florida Department of Corrections. In 1991, Singletary was appointed Secretary of the Florida Department of Corrections by Governor Lawton Chiles. In remarks made after his acceptance, Singletary said "In my leadership position, I will work with our communities and school system to try to make an impact on corrections in Florida. I will share with everyone my lessons learned within the criminal justice system."

Singletary was popular among his employees and was known to promote staff input in Department policies. Department employees noted his sense of humor and 'walk around' style of management

Singletary described his role as Secretary as "that of a caretaker or steward, not as a bureaucrat." In 1992, he was awarded the E.R. Cass Correctional Achievement Award from the American Correctional Association, the highest recognition a correctional professional can get.

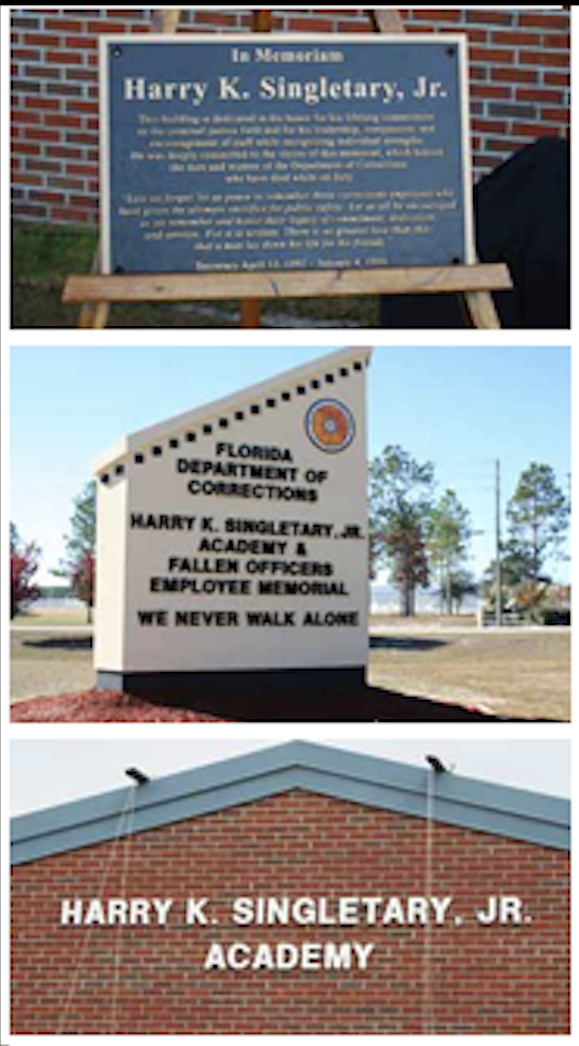
Harry K. Singletary, Jr. Academy and Fallen Officers Employee Memorial at Wakulla CI in Crawfordville, Florida.

Singletary adopted the theme of "Corrections as a Business" as his philosophy and sought to incorporate technology in the Department's work. In his time as Secretary, Singletary introduced the cashless canteen for inmates, the court ordered payment system (COPS) for probation payments, and the Computer Assisted Reception Process (CARP). His incorporation of new technologies in the Department's day-to-day operations earned them the reputation for being one of the most respected and emulated criminal justice computer systems in the country.

After serving as secretary of the Florida Department of Corrections, Singletary taught criminology classes at Florida State University for a year. From 2000 to 2008, he worked for the Leon County School District where he helped troubled students in the community.

In 2011, the Memorial for Fallen Officers at Wakulla Training Center was renamed the Harry K. Singletary, Jr., Training Academy.
