= Julie L. Jones =

United States corrections officer

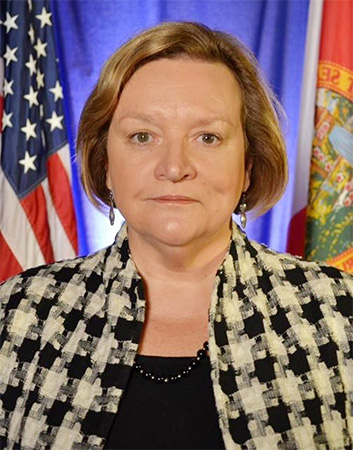
- Portrait of Julie Jones, former Secretary of the Florida Department of Corrections

Secretary of the Florida Department of Corrections
- In office December 10, 2014 – January 7, 2019
- Appointed by: Rick Scott
- Preceded by: Michael D. Crews
- Succeeded by: Mark S. Inch

Deputy Chief Financial Officer of the Florida Department of Financial Services
- Incumbent
- Assumed office January 2021
- Appointed by: Jimmy Patronis

Personal details
- Education: Florida Atlantic University

Julie L. Jones is an American corrections officer who served as secretary of the Florida Department of Corrections from 2014 to 2019. Jones was appointed by Governor Rick Scott to replace outgoing secretary Michael D. Crews. She was Governor Scott's fourth and final secretary of corrections in his eight years in office. Jones is the first and only woman to serve in the position.

Jones earned a Bachelor of Science and a Master of Science from Florida Atlantic University.

Before she was appointed secretary, Jones served as the chief of the Florida Department of Highway Safety and Motor Vehicles for five years. Prior to that, Jones worked at the Florida Fish and Wildlife Conservation Commission for over 20 years, where she served as the director of law enforcement until 2009.

Jones took over the Department of Corrections in the midst of numerous investigations and lawsuits concerning inmate abuse and corruption. There were also several whistleblowers who claimed that they faced retaliation for exposing cover-ups of inmate abuse and questions about inmate health care after the state privatized health services in 2013.

Jones was replaced by Mark S. Inch when Governor Ron DeSantis took office in 2019. Three weeks later, New Mexico Governor Lujan Grisham announced her plans to nominate Jones as the New Mexico Secretary of Corrections. The next month, however, Jones announced that she would not be able to accept the position anymore, citing personal reasons.

On December 29, 2020, Florida Chief Financial Officer Jimmy Patronis appointed Jones to serve as Deputy Chief Financial Officer, replacing Jay Etheridge. Patronis said of her appointment, “Through her decades of executive-level leadership, coupled with her experience in law enforcement, we’ll need her out-of-the-box thinking, and her relationships with local prosecutors and law enforcement agencies, to take the fight against the criminal elements that are stealing from hardworking Floridians."
