= H. G. Cochran =

American politician

Henry Grady Cochran Jr.
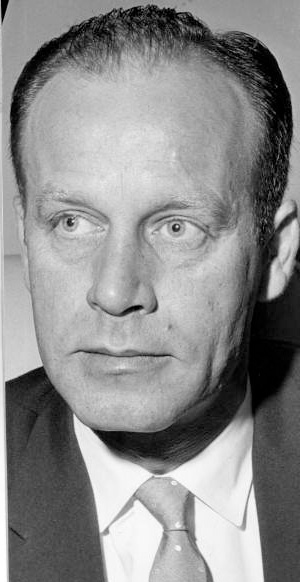

Director of the Florida Division of Corrections
- In office 1959–1962
- Preceded by: R.O. Culver
- Succeeded by: Louie L. Wainwright

Personal details
- Born: August 3, 1923; Lake City, Florida, U.S.
- Died: June 20, 1986 (aged 62); Leon County, Florida, U.S.
- Known for: Original respondent in Gideon v. Wainwright

Henry Grady Cochran, Jr. (August 3, 1923 – June 20, 1986) was Florida Director of the Division of Corrections from 1959 to 1962. He replaced R.O. Culver and was later succeeded by Louie L. Wainwright. He is notable for being the original respondent in the U.S. Supreme Court case Gideon v. Wainwright.

Born in Lake City, Florida, H. G. Cochran served in the United States Army during World War II. He enlisted on October 24, 1942 and served as a private in a field artillery unit. His unit aided in the liberation of the Dachau concentration camp in 1945.

During his tenure as director the first Transition Officers were hired to assist inmates with placement upon release, a male unit was opened in the Florida Correctional Institution, the Apalachee Correctional Institution's West Unit was opened, and the Marion Correctional Institution and Caryville Work Camp were established. Additionally, a new six-digit numbering system to identify inmates was implemented and a new maximum security unit was added to the Florida State Prison in Starke, Florida. The official newsletter of the Florida Division of Corrections, the Correctional Compass, made its debut, and on 1 October 1961, the Division of Corrections assumed responsibility for the administration of all phases of Road Prison operation from the Florida State Road Department. He died in 1986 in Leon County, Florida.
