= United States v. Lane =

- Supreme Court of the United States

Decided January 27, 1986
- Full case name: United States v. Lane
- Docket no.: 84-744
- Citations: 474 U.S. 438 (more)

Holding
- Misjoinder under Rule 8(b) is subject to harmless error analysis, and it is not reversible error per se.

Court membership
- Chief Justice Warren E. Burger Associate Justices William J. Brennan Jr. · Byron White; Thurgood Marshall · Harry Blackmun; Lewis F. Powell Jr. · William Rehnquist; John P. Stevens · Sandra Day O'Connor

Case opinions
- Majority: BURGER, joined by WHITE, POWELL, REHNQUIST, O'CONNOR; BRENNAN, MARSHALL, BLACKMUN, STEVENS (Part III only)
- Concur/dissent: BRENNAN, joined by BLACKMUN
- Concur/dissent: STEVENS, joined by MARSHALL

Laws applied
- Federal Rule of Criminal Procedure 8(b)
- This case overturned a previous ruling or rulings
- McElroy v. United States (1896)

United States v. Lane, 474 U.S. 438 (1986), was a United States Supreme Court case in which the court held that misjoinder under Federal Rule of Criminal Procedure 8(b) is subject to harmless error analysis, and it is not reversible error per se.

== Background ==
In 1896, the United States Supreme Court held in McElroy v. United States that, under the rules active at that time, misjoiner always required that criminal defendants receive a new trial.

James Lane and his son, Dennis (collectively, Lane) were indicted on counts for, among other things, mail fraud in connection with insurance claims that were made and that insurers paid for fire damage to a restaurant and duplex that James had hired a professional arsonist to burn. The restaurant was operated by James in partnership with others. Count 1 charged James with mail fraud with regard to that fire. The duplex was owned by a different partnership, of which Dennis was one of the partners. Counts 2 through 4 charged both respondents with mail fraud related to the duplex fire. Count 5 charged both respondents with conspiracy to commit mail fraud in connection with a third arson scheme, and Count 6 charged Dennis with perjury before the grand jury.

The federal District Court denied Lane's pretrial motions for severance on the alleged ground that the charged offenses were misjoined in violation of Federal Rule of Criminal Procedure 8(b), which provides that two or more defendants may be charged in the same indictment if they are alleged to have participated "in the same act or transaction or in the same series of acts or transactions constituting an offense or offenses." The trial then proceeded jointly before a jury. When evidence relating to the restaurant fire was admitted, the court instructed the jury not to consider that evidence against Dennis, and repeated this instruction in the final charge and admonished the jury to consider each count and defendant separately. The jury returned convictions on all counts.

The Court of Appeals reversed and remanded for new trials, holding that the joinder of Count 1 with the other five counts violated Rule 8(b) and that such misjoinder was prejudicial per se. The court, however, rejected Lane's contention that there was insufficient evidence to support convictions under Counts 2 through 4 because each charged mailing occurred after each related insurance payment had been received and thus after each scheme to defraud had reached fruition.

The Supreme Court granted certiorari.

== Opinion of the court ==
The Supreme Court issued an opinion on January 27, 1986.
