= List of United States Supreme Court cases, volume 474 =

This is a list of all United States Supreme Court cases from volume 474 of the United States Reports:

Case name	Citation	Date decided
Kentucky v. Indiana	474 U.S. 1	1985
Settling a dispute over the boundary line between Kentucky and Indiana.
Cuyahoga Valley R. Co. v. Transportation Union	474 U.S. 3	1985
The Secretary of Labor has unreviewable discretion to withdraw a citation charging an employer with violating OSHA.
California Bd. of Equalization v. Chemehuevi Tribe	474 U.S. 9	1985
If the legal incidence of the tax falls on non-Native purchasers, the state may impose on the tribe the burden of collecting the tax, and the state may collect from the tribe even if the statute does not explicitly direct the tribe to do this collection.
Delaware v. Fensterer	474 U.S. 15	1985
The admission of the state's expert's opinion despite the expert's inability to recall the basis for that opinion did not offend the Confrontation Clause or due process.
Lanier v. South Carolina	474 U.S. 25	1985
A finding of voluntariness of a confession for Fifth Amendment purposes is not, by itself, sufficient to purge the taint of an illegal arrest; it is merely a threshold requirement for Fourth Amendment analysis. Grant, vacate, remand.
Pennsylvania v. Goldhammer	474 U.S. 28	1985
Pennsylvania Bureau of Correction v. United States Marshals Service	474 U.S. 34	1985
Hill v. Lockhart	474 U.S. 52	1985
Green v. Mansour	474 U.S. 64	1985
Heath v. Alabama	474 U.S. 82	1985
Miller v. Fenton	474 U.S. 104	1985
Lake Coal Co. v. Roberts & Schaeffer Co.	474 U.S. 120	1985
United States v. Riverside Bayview Homes, Inc.	474 U.S. 121	1985
Thomas v. Arn	474 U.S. 140	1985
Maine v. Moulton	474 U.S. 159	1985
Cleavinger v. Saxner	474 U.S. 193	1985
Eastern Air Lines, Inc. v. Mahfoud	474 U.S. 213	1985
Regents of Univ. of Mich. v. Ewing	474 U.S. 214	1985
United States v. Rojas-Contreras	474 U.S. 231	1985
United States v. Von Neumann	474 U.S. 242	1986
Vasquez v. Hillery	474 U.S. 254	1986
Wainwright v. Greenfield	474 U.S. 284	1986
United States v. Loud Hawk	474 U.S. 302	1986
Daniels v. Williams	474 U.S. 327	1986
Davidson v. Cannon	474 U.S. 344	1986
Board of Governors, FRS v. Dimension Financial Corp.	474 U.S. 361	1986
Cabana v. Bullock	474 U.S. 376	1986
Appellate courts may make the finding required by Enmund v. Florida in the first instance.
Transcontinental Gas Pipe Line Corp. v. State Oil and Gas Bd. of Miss.	474 U.S. 409	1986
United States v. Lane	474 U.S. 438	1986
Misjoinder under Rule 8(b) is subject to harmless error analysis, and is not reversible error per se.
Witters v. Washington Dept. of Servs. for Blind	474 U.S. 481	1986
Midlantic Nat. Bank v. New Jersey Dept. of Environmental Protection	474 U.S. 494	1986
Parsons Steel, Inc. v. First Alabama Bank	474 U.S. 518	1986
A federal court violates the Full Faith and Credit Clause when it enjoins a state court from enforcing a judgment that is based on prior federal judgments, even when the state court's application of res judicata may have been erroneous.
