= Charles E. Samuels Jr. =

Director of the Federal Bureau of Prisons from 2011 to 2016

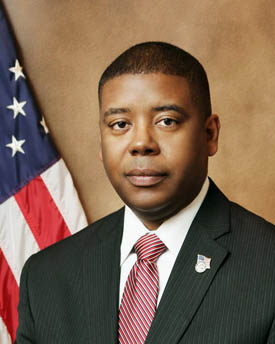
- Official portrait, 2012

8th Director of the Federal Bureau of Prisons
- In office December 21, 2011 – January 9, 2016
- President: Barack Obama
- Preceded by: Harley Lappin
- Succeeded by: Mark S. Inch

Personal details
- Born: Charles Edward Samuels Jr. June 7, 1966 (age 60) Birmingham, Alabama, U.S.
- Spouse: Tonya Samuels
- Children: Amber Samuels
- Education: University of Alabama at Birmingham (B.S.)

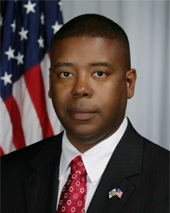
Charles E. Samuels Jr.

Charles E. Samuels Jr. (born June 7, 1966) is an American correctional officer who served as the eighth director of the Federal Bureau of Prisons from 2011 to 2016. He was the first African-American to hold the position.

He is a graduate of the University of Alabama at Birmingham, where he received his B.S. in Criminal Justice in 1987 and in 2012 received the school's Distinguished Alumni Achievement Award. As director, he was responsible for the oversight and management of the Bureau of Prisons, which employs more than 39,000 staff and confines over 200,000 inmates under jurisdiction of the agency. As a career public administrator, he was appointed director of the federal agency on December 21, 2011, by Attorney General Eric Holder, and is the eighth director since the BOP's establishment in 1930.

== Early life ==
Samuels was born on June 7, 1966, in Birmingham, Alabama, at Lloyd Noland Hospital to Gwendolyn and Charles E. Samuels Sr. He grew up in Forestdale, Alabama, with two siblings, Camise and Crystal. He attended Minor High School in Adamsville before transferring and graduating early from Ensley High School. Samuels earned a Bachelor of Science degree in Criminal Justice from the University of Alabama at Birmingham's College of Social and Behavioral Sciences in 1987.

== Career ==
Samuels began his career with the bureau as a correctional officer in March 1988. Subsequently, he was selected for positions of increasing responsibility, including case manager trainee at FCI Talladega (AL), case manager at USP Atlanta (GA), community corrections trainee and community corrections oversight specialist at FCI Phoenix (AZ), unit manager at FCI Dublin (CA), program review division examiner in Central Office, and regional correctional programs administrator and executive assistant for the Northeast region. Samuels served as associate warden at FCIs Otisville (NY) and Beckley (WV), ombudsman in Central Office, and warden at FCIs Manchester (KY) and Fort Dix (NJ), prior to being named senior deputy assistant director of the Correctional Programs Division (CPD). He was made assistant director of CPD in January 2011, where he oversaw all inmate management and program functions, including intelligence and counterterrorism initiatives, female offender issues, security and emergency planning, privatization, sex offender management, drug treatment, designations, inmate transportation, case management, mental health, religious services and residential reentry services. Samuels was also responsible for establishing the agency's Reentry Services Division.

== Awards and recognition ==
In June 2002, Samuels was named Associate Warden of the Year for the Mid-Atlantic Region.

In June 2006, Samuels was appointed to the Senior Executive Service while serving as Warden at FCI Fort Dix.

In August 2007, Samuels completed the Harvard University Executive Education Program for senior managers in government.

In 2012, Samuels received UAB's Distinguished Alumni Achievement Award.

In October 2015, Attorney General Loretta E. Lynch presented Samuels with the Edward H. Levi Award for Outstanding Professionalism and Exemplary Integrity at the 63rd Annual Attorney General's Awards Ceremony. This award pays tribute to the memory and achievements of former Attorney General Edward H. Levi, whose career as an attorney, law professor and dean, and public servant exemplified outstanding professionalism and exemplary integrity in the best traditions of the Department of Justice.

In December 2015, Attorney General Lynch presented Samuels with the U.S. Department of Justice's highest award - the Edmund J. Randolph Award. Named for the first Attorney General of the United States, appointed by President George Washington, it recognizes outstanding contributions to the accomplishments of the Department's mission.
