= Kathleen Hawk Sawyer =

Director of the Federal Bureau of Prisons (1992–2003; 2019–2020)

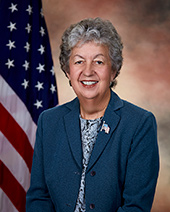
- Official portrait, 2019

Director of the Federal Bureau of Prisons
- In office August 19, 2019 – February 25, 2020
- Deputy: Thomas R. Kane
- Preceded by: Hugh Hurwitz (Acting)
- Succeeded by: Michael Carvajal
- In office December 4, 1992 – April 4, 2003
- Preceded by: J. Michael Quinlan
- Succeeded by: Harley G. Lappin

Personal details
- Education: Wheeling Jesuit College; West Virginia University

Kathleen Hawk Sawyer is an American psychologist and former director of the Federal Bureau of Prisons. Serving as the first female director, Sawyer occupied the position from 1992 until 2003. On August 19, 2019, Attorney General William Barr re-appointed her as director of the Bureau of Prisons. She left this role on February 25, 2020.

== Education ==
Sawyer is a graduate of Wheeling Jesuit College, where she obtained a bachelor's degree in psychology. She obtained both a master's degree and an Ed.D. in Counseling and Rehabilitation from West Virginia University.

== Career ==
=== Early career ===
In 1976, Sawyer was employed as a psychologist at the Federal Correctional Institution, Morgantown in Morgantown, West Virginia. This employment started her career with the Federal Bureau of Prisons. She was named Chief of Psychology Services at the institution in 1983. Sawyer started her career in 1976 as a psychologist at the Federal Correctional Facility in Morgantown, West Virginia. She went on to hold positions at various prisons across the United States, including at Sargus Juvenile Detention Center in St. Clairsville, Ohio. While at the Sargus Juvenile Detention Center, she established a psychological counseling program for juveniles and their families. In May 1989, she became the assistant director for the Program Review Division at the Central Office of the Federal Bureau of Prisons. While in that position, she "was responsible for developing and implementing a system of internal controls for all Bureau operations."

=== Director of the Federal Bureau of Prisons ===
On December 4, 1992, Sawyer was appointed the director of the Federal Bureau of Prisons by William Barr, the Attorney General at the time. While director, she focused her efforts on reducing recidivism by giving more opportunities for education and employment to prisoners. She also sought to offer secondary education at every federal institution, and substance abuse programs. Sawyer retired from the position in 2003.

On August 19, 2019, Barr re-appointed her as director of the Federal Bureau of Prisons as part of a shake-up following the death of Jeffrey Epstein.

== Honors ==
In 1992, she received the Attorney General's Award for Excellence in Management. In 1994, she received the Presidential Rank Award for Meritorious Service. In 1997, President Bill Clinton awarded her with the Presidential Distinguished Executive Award, which is the highest governmental award that is offered to professionals in her line of work. Also in 1997, she received the Surgeon General's Medallion from the Office of the Surgeon General. Sawyer was awarded with the Association of State Correctional Administrators' Michael Francke Award in 1998. In 2000, she again received the Presidential Rank Award for Meritorious Service. In 2001, Sawyer was awarded the Edmund Randolph Award for outstanding service in the Department of Justice. She was also awarded the Eastern Kentucky University College of Justice and Safety Distinguished Professional Award in 2003.
