= Martin Correctional Institution =

Prison in Martin County, Florida

Coordinates: 27°11′54″N 80°29′23″W

- Overhead view of MATCI
- Interactive map of Martin Correctional Institution
- Location: 1150 S.W. Allapattah Road Indiantown, Florida
- Status: Operational
- Security class: Minimum, medium, and close
- Capacity: 1,926 = 1,524 (main unit) + 402 (satellite unit(s))
- Population: 1,739 = 1,455 (main unit) + 284 (satellite unit(s)) (July 2025)
- Opened: 1985
- Managed by: Florida Department of Corrections
- Warden: Jeffrey Robinson

Martin Correctional Institution (MATCI) is a state prison for adult men located in Indiantown, Martin County, Florida, operated by the Florida Department of Corrections.

Martin Correctional Institution opened in 1985 and has a maximum capacity of 1,926 prisoners. The facility has a mix of security levels, including minimum, medium, and close.

== History ==
In 1989, after a seven-day manhunt, deputies and volunteers captured escapees Reynaldo Prieto and Aurelio Ocana Gonzalez near Hobe Sound, northwest of Jonathan Dickinson State Park.

In 2019, inmate Scott Whitney released some clandestine film he took of the facility.

In September 2026, Makia Lashay Shivers was arrested outside Martin Correctional Institution with 464 grams of methamphetamine, K2/THC, 37 cell phones, alcohol, and other items. She reported two Broward men abandoned her during a failed drop and faces multiple charges.

== Notable Inmates ==
- Michael Boatwright - Sentenced to two consecutive life sentences without the possibility of parole, plus another consecutive 30 years in prison for the murder of XXXTentacion on June 18, 2018.
