= Cuyahoga Valley Railway Co. v. Transportation Union =

- Supreme Court of the United States

Decided November 4, 1985
- Full case name: Cuyahoga Valley Railway Co. v. Transportation Union
- Citations: 474 U.S. 3 (more)

Holding
- The Secretary of Labor has unreviewable discretion to withdraw a citation charging an employer with violating OSHA.

Court membership
- Chief Justice Warren E. Burger Associate Justices William J. Brennan Jr. · Byron White; Thurgood Marshall · Harry Blackmun; Lewis F. Powell Jr. · William Rehnquist; John P. Stevens · Sandra Day O'Connor

Case opinions
- Per curiam
- Dissent: BRENNAN, BLACKMUN
- Dissent: Marshall

Laws applied
- Occupational Safety and Health Act

Cuyahoga Valley Railway Co. v. Transportation Union, 474 U.S. 3 (1985), was a United States Supreme Court case in which the court held that the Secretary of Labor has unreviewable discretion to withdraw a citation charging an employer with violating the Occupational Safety and Health Act.

== Background ==
Pursuant to the Occupational Safety and Health Act (Act), the Secretary of Labor issued a citation to Cuyahoga Valley Railway Company for a violation of the Act; the company contested the citation; the Secretary filed a complaint with the Occupational Safety and Health Review Commission (Commission), and the company filed an answer; and the United Transportation Union, which represents the company's employees, intervened. At the hearing, the Administrative Law Judge (ALJ), over the Union's objection, granted the Secretary's motion to vacate the citation on the ground that the Secretary did not have jurisdiction over the relevant safety conditions. Despite the Secretary's objection, the Commission directed review of the ALJ's order and ultimately remanded the case to the ALJ for consideration of the Union's objections. The Court of Appeals for the Sixth Circuit affirmed, holding that, because the adversarial process was well advanced at the time the Secretary attempted to withdraw the citation, the commission, as the adjudicative body, had the authority to review the Secretary's withdrawal of the citation.

The Supreme Court granted certiorari.

== Opinion of the court ==
The Supreme Court issued an opinion on November 4, 1985.

Marshall issued a boilerplate dissent because he thought it was unfair to decide the case without allowing the parties the ability to fully brief the case. Marshall did this on several cases during the 1985 term.
