= Federal Bureau of Prisons =

U.S. federal law enforcement agency

- Seal of the Federal Bureau of Prisons

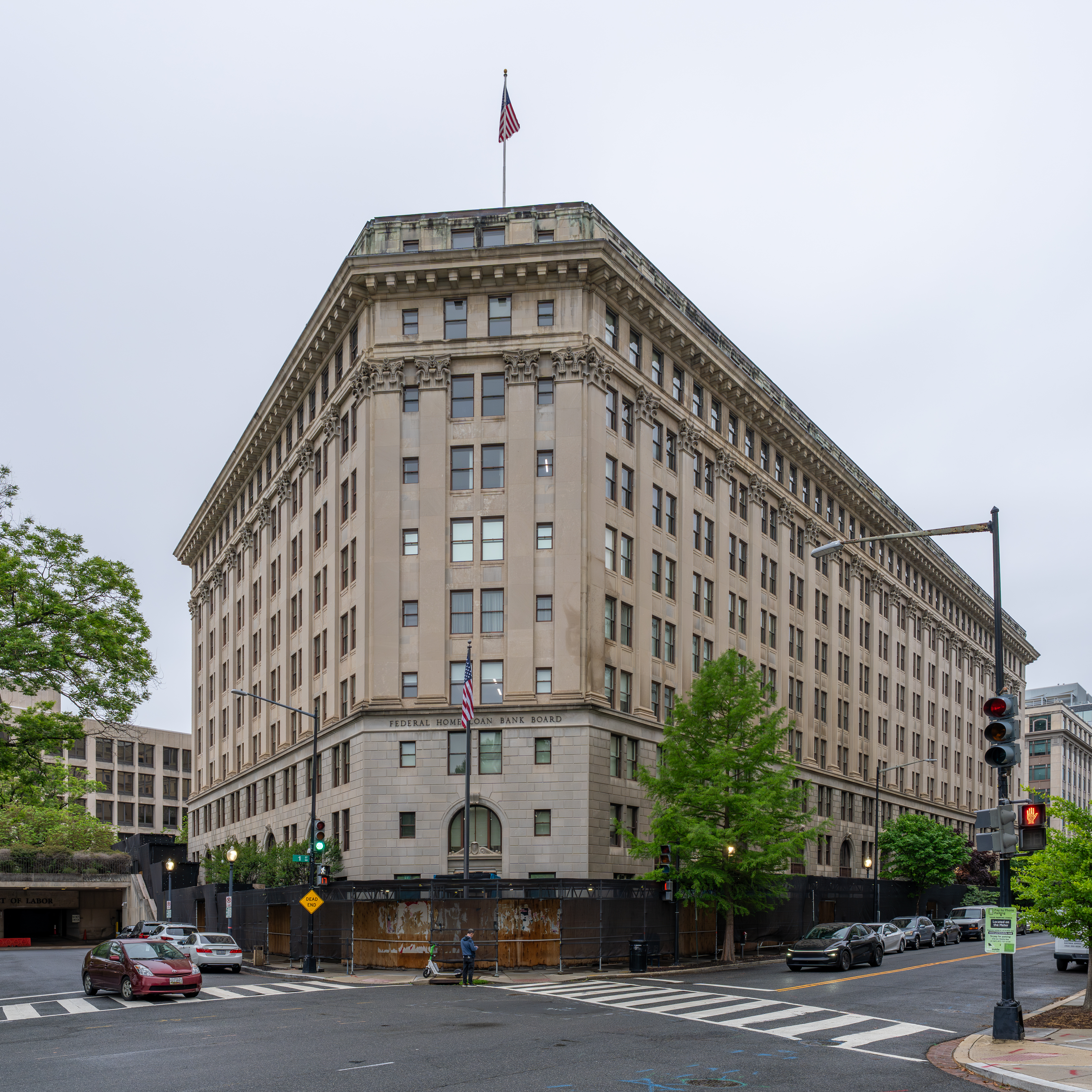
- Headquarters in Federal Home Loan Bank Board Building (2026)

Agency overview
- Formed: May 14, 1930; 96 years ago
- Headquarters: Federal Home Loan Bank Board Building, Washington, D.C., U.S.
- Motto: Courage. Respect. Integrity. Correctional Excellence.
- Employees: 35,764
- Annual budget: US$9.3 billion (FY 2021)
- Agency executives: William K. Marshall III, Director; Joshua J. Smith, Deputy Director; Vacant, Associate Deputy Director
- Parent agency: Department of Justice
- Website: bop.gov

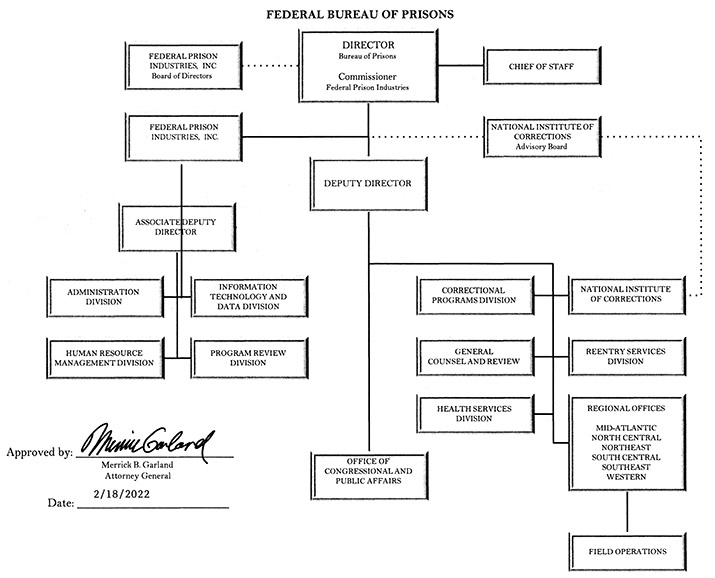
Organizational chart of the Federal Bureau of Prisons

The Federal Bureau of Prisons (FBOP) is a federal law enforcement agency of the United States Department of Justice that is responsible for all federal prisons in the country and provides for the care, custody, and control of federal prisoners.

== History ==
The federal prison system had existed for more than 30 years before the BOP was established. Although its wardens functioned almost autonomously, the Superintendent of Prisons, a Department of Justice official in Washington, was nominally in charge of federal prisons. The passage of the "Three Prisons Act" in 1891 authorized the first three federal penitentiaries: USP Leavenworth, USP Atlanta, and USP McNeil Island with limited supervision by the Department of Justice.

Until 1907, prison matters were handled by the Justice Department General Agent, with responsibility for Justice Department accounts, oversight of internal operations, certain criminal investigations as well as prison operations. In 1907, the General Agent was abolished, and its functions were distributed between three new offices: the Division of Accounts (which evolved into the Justice Management Division); the Office of the Chief Examiner (which evolved in 1908 into the Bureau of Investigation, and in the early 1920s into the Federal Bureau of Investigation); and the Office of the Superintendent of Prisons and Prisoners, later called the Superintendent of Prisons (which evolved in 1930 into the Bureau of Prisons).

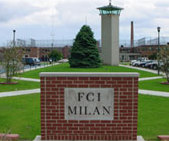
The exterior of Federal Correctional Institution, Milan

The Bureau of Prisons was established within the Department of Justice on May 14, 1930 by the United States Congress, and was charged with the "management and regulation of all Federal penal and correctional institutions." This responsibility covered the administration of the 11 federal prisons in operation at the time. By the end of 1930, the system had expanded to 14 institutions with 13,000 inmates, and a decade later in 1940, the system had 24 institutions with 24,360 incarcerated. A statute in May 1930 provided for the employment of prisoners, the creation of a corporation for the purpose was authorized by a statute in June 1934, and the Federal Prison Industries was created by executive order in December 1934 by Franklin D. Roosevelt.

The state of Alaska assumed jurisdiction over its corrections on January 3, 1959, using the Alaska Department of Corrections; prior to statehood, the BOP had correctional jurisdiction over Alaska.

As a result of the Sentencing Reform Act of 1984 and subsequent legislation, which pushed for longer sentences, less judicial discretion, and harsher sentences for drug-related offenses, the federal inmate population doubled in the 1980s and again in the 1990s. The population increase decelerated in the early 2000s, but the population continued to increase until 2014.

The National Capital Revitalization and Self-Government Improvement Act of 1997 transferred responsibility for adult felons convicted of violating District of Columbia laws to the BOP.

Charles E. Samuels Jr. became the first African American director in 2011.

== Administration and employees ==
Colette S. Peters resigned as of January 20, 2025, and Deputy Director William Lothrop served as the acting director until his retirement on February 28, 2025. The Bureau of Prisons' current director, William K. Marshall III, was sworn in on April 21, 2025.

As of December 2024, 60.5% of Bureau employees are white, 21.5% are black, 14.3% are Hispanic, 2.5% are Asian, and 1.2% are Native American. 70.7% are male and 29.3% are female. There is roughly one corrections officer for every 12.5 prisoners.

All BOP law enforcement employees undergo 200 hours of formal training in their first year of employment and an additional 120 hours of training at the Federal Law Enforcement Training Centers (FLETC) in Glynco, Georgia.

== Past directors ==
Portrait	Director	Took office	Left office
	Sanford Bates	1930	1937
	James V. Bennett	1937	1964
	Myrl E. Alexander	1964	1970
	Norman A. Carlson	1970	1987
	J. Michael Quinlan	July 1987	1992
	Kathleen Hawk Sawyer	December 4, 1992	April 4, 2003
	Harley G. Lappin	April 4, 2003	December 21, 2011
	Charles E. Samuels Jr.	December 21, 2011	January 9, 2016
	Mark S. Inch	September 18, 2017	May 18, 2018
	Hugh Hurwitz (acting)	May 18, 2018	August 19, 2019
	Kathleen Hawk Sawyer	August 19, 2019	February 25, 2020
	Michael D. Carvajal	February 25, 2020	August 2, 2022
	Colette S. Peters	August 2, 2022	January 20, 2025
	William Marshall III	April 21, 2025	Present

== Types of federal prisons ==
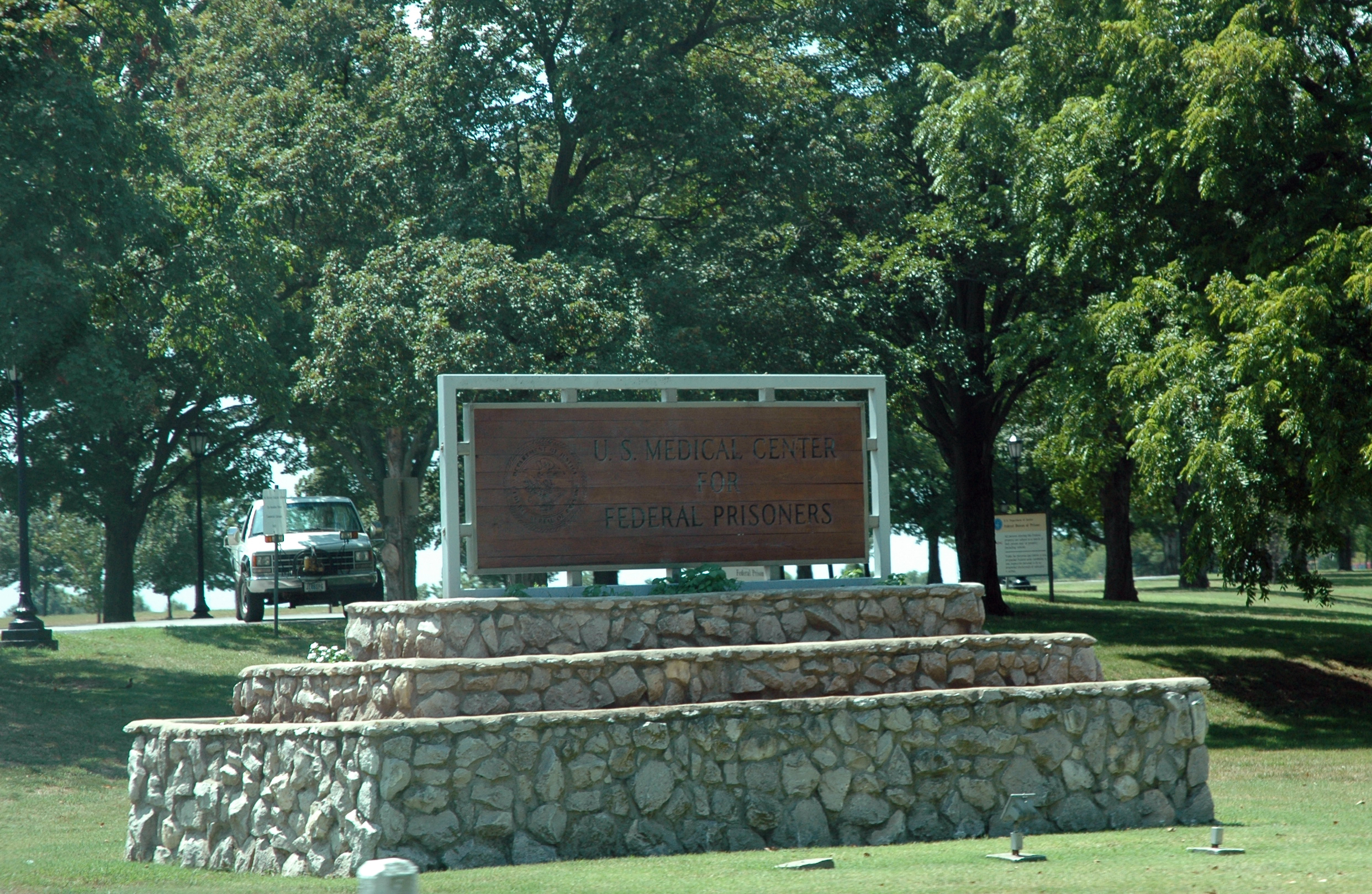
The United States Medical Center for Federal Prisoners, a unit for male prisoners requiring medical care

The BOP has five security levels:

- Federal Prison Camps (FPCs), the BOP minimum-security facilities, feature a lack of or a limited amount of perimeter fencing and a relatively low staff-to-inmate ratio.
- Low-security Federal Correctional Institutions (FCIs) have double-fenced perimeters, and inmates live mostly in cubicles or dormitory housing.
- Medium-security FCIs and some United States Penitentiaries (USPs) are classified to hold medium-security inmates. The medium facilities have strengthened perimeters which often consist of double fences with electronic detection systems. Medium-security facilities mostly have cell housing.
- Most U.S. Penitentiaries are classified as high-security facilities. The perimeters are highly secured and often have reinforced fences or walls.
- Federal Correctional Complexes (FCCs) are co-locations of BOP facilities with different security levels and/or genders.
- Administrative Security Facilities are prisons with special missions and capabilities. An example would be Federal Medical Centers, which house sick and injured inmates getting medical care that is beyond the capabilities of a normal institution.

Some units have small, adjacent, minimum-security "satellite camps". Twenty-eight institutions hold female inmates. As of 2010, about 15% of Bureau inmates are in facilities operated by third parties, mostly private companies, while others are in local and state facilities. Some are in privately operated Residential Reentry Centers (RRC) or Community Corrections Centers. The Bureau uses contract facilities to manage its own prison population because they are "especially useful" for housing low-security, specialized groups of people, such as sentenced criminal aliens.

== Officers ==
Officers employed by the FBOP are uniformed federal law enforcement officers who are responsible for the care, custody, and control of federal inmates. Primary law enforcement officers working for the Bureau of Prisons have statutory powers of arrest per the United States Code, and the ability to carry a firearm off duty.

The BOP has multiple specialty units including the Special Operations Response Team, Crisis Negotiation Team, Special Investigative Service and Disturbance Control Team.

BOP Special Operations Response Teams (SORT) and Disturbance Control Teams (DCT) are trained specifically for high-risk crises both inside and outside of correctional environments, focusing on containment, de-escalation, and use of force.

SORT units are highly specialized tactical teams used for high-risk scenarios like hostage situations, riot control, and other emergency operations.

Their training is rigorous and ongoing:

- Initial Selection & Certification: Members undergo a demanding selection process including physical fitness assessments, policy examinations, and courses in basic tactical skills like rappelling, building entries, and disturbance control.
- Monthly/Annual Training: SORT members must complete a minimum of 96 hours of training annually, often exceeding 16 hours monthly, in areas such as:
  - Firearms Proficiency: Handling and using various weapons, including submachine guns and less-lethal options.
  - Riot Control Techniques: Training using simulated prison disturbances and large-scale mock operations.
  - Use of Force: Training emphasizes the use of chemical agents (like OC spray), distraction devices ("flash-bangs"), and specialty impact munitions.
  - Hostage Negotiation Integration: Training involves working alongside negotiation teams during scenario-based exercises.
  - Breaching and Tactical Movement: Specialized training for forced entry into barricaded areas or cells.

DCT units are distinct from SORT and focus primarily on crowd control scenarios within prisons. Their training is less specialized and rigorous than SORT, with annual requirements of around 40 hours of training per year, focusing on core skills for managing inmate disturbances. Both teams are routinely activated to assist other federal agencies in managing incidents, such as the nationwide protests in 2020 following the murder of George Floyd by a police officer.

== Inmate population ==
Past inmate population totals
FY	Population	Change
2000	145,125	+11,436
2001	156,572	+11,447
2002	163,436	+6,864
2003	172,499	+9,063
2004	179,895	+7,396
2005	187,394	+7,499
2006	192,584	+5,190
2007	200,020	+7,436
2008	201,668	+1,648
2009	208,759	+7,091
2010	210,227	+1,468
2011	217,768	+7,541
2012	218,687	+919
2013	219,298	+611
2014	214,149	-5,149
2015	205,723	-8,426
2016	192,170	-13,553
2017	185,617	-6,553
2018	181,698	-3,919
2019	177,214	-4,484
2020	155,562	-21,652
2021	155,826	+264
2022	159,090	+3,264
2023	158,424	-666
2024	158,864	+440

As of December 2024, the Bureau was responsible for approximately 157,504 inmates, in 122 facilities. 56.7% of inmates were white, 38.9% were black, 2.9% Native American, and 1.5% Asian; 93.5% were male and 6.5% were female. 29.2% were of Hispanic ethnicity, which may be any of these four races. 74.5% of inmates were between the ages of 26 and 50.

As of 1999, 14,000 prisoners were in 16 federal prisons in the state of Texas.

As of 2010, almost 8,000 felons in 90 facilities, sentenced under D.C. laws, made up about 6% of the total Bureau population.

As of August 2020, 46.2% of inmates were incarcerated for drug offenses.

The BOP receives all prisoner transfer treaty inmates sent from foreign countries, even if their crimes would have been tried in state, DC, or territorial courts if committed in the United States.

=== Female inmates ===
As of 2015, 27 Bureau facilities house women. The Bureau has a Mothers and Infants Nurturing Together (MINT) program for women who enter the system as inmates while pregnant. The Bureau pays for abortion only if it is life-threatening for the woman, but it may allow for abortions in non-life-threatening cases if non-BOP funds are used. The use of shackles to restrain pregnant women has historically been a controversial issue in the prison system. In 2018, the First Step Act prohibited the use of restraints on pregnant women unless the woman poses a health or security threat.

In 2017, four Democratic Senators, including Kamala Harris, introduced a bill explicitly requiring tampons and pads to be free for female prisoners. In August 2017, the Bureau introduced a memorandum requiring free tampons and pads. The previous 1996 memorandum stated "products for female hygiene needs shall be available" without requiring them to be free of charge.

A 2018 review by the Evaluation and Inspections Division, Office of the Inspector General, U.S. Department of Justice, found the Bureau's programming and policy decisions did not fully consider the needs of female inmates in the areas of trauma treatment programming, pregnancy programming, and feminine hygiene.

=== Juvenile inmates ===
As of 2010, juveniles sent into Bureau custody are between 17 and 20 and must have been under 18 at the time of the offense. According to the Bureau, most of the juveniles it receives had committed violent crimes and had "an unfavorable history of responding to interventions and preventive measures in the community." In 2010, most federal juvenile inmates were from Arizona, Montana, South Dakota, Nebraska and the District of Columbia.

As of June 2024, there are 14 juvenile inmates (those under the age of 18) in BOP custody.

The Bureau contracts with facilities that house juvenile offenders. Title 18, U.S.C. 5039 specifies that "No juvenile committed...may be placed or retained in an adult jail or correctional institution in which he has regular contact with adults incarcerated because they have been convicted of a crime or are awaiting trial on criminal charges." The definition includes secure facilities and community-based correctional facilities. Federally sentenced juveniles may be moved into federal adult facilities at certain points; juveniles sentenced as adults are moved into adult facilities when they turn 18 and juveniles that were sentenced as juveniles are moved into adult facilities when they turn 21.

=== Death row inmates ===
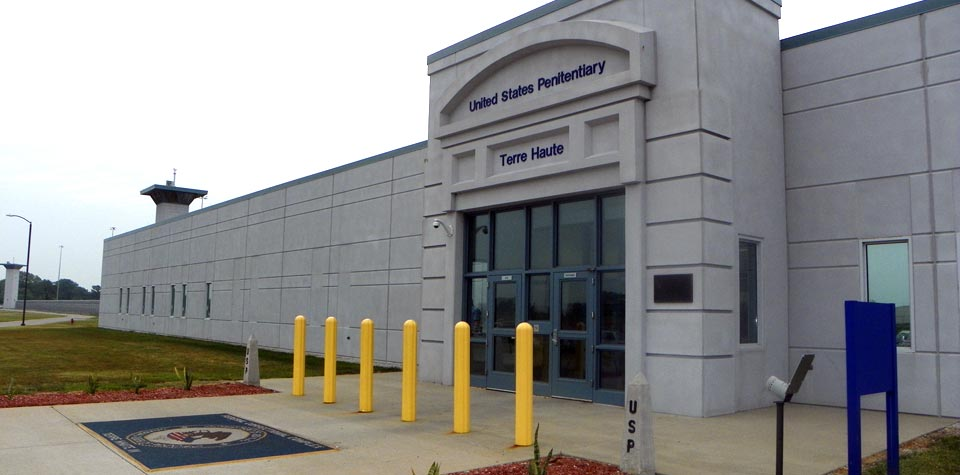
United States Penitentiary, Terre Haute, the location of the federal death row for men and the federal execution chamber

The Anti-Drug Abuse Act of 1988 reinstituted the federal death penalty. On July 19, 1993, the federal government designated the United States Penitentiary, Terre Haute in Indiana as the site of execution for both males and females sentenced to execution. The Federal Medical Center, Carswell in Texas holds the female inmates who have been sentenced to death.

Some male death row inmates are instead held at ADX Florence.

Under the first Trump administration, the BOP carried out 13 executions.

On December 23, 2024, President Biden commuted 37 of the 40 current federal death row inmates to life in prison without the possibility of parole. This leaves just 3 inmates on federal death row: Robert Gregory Bowers, Dylann Roof, and Dzhokhar Tsarnaev.

=== Overpopulation and responses ===
Parole was abolished for federal inmates in 1987 and inmates must serve at least 85% of their original sentence before being considered for good-behavior release. The current sentencing guidelines were adopted in response to rising crime rates in the 1980s and early 1990s, especially for drug-related offenses. Some analysts and activists believe that strict federal sentencing guidelines have led to overcrowding and needlessly incarcerated thousands of non-violent drug offenders who would be better served by drug treatment programs.

The yearly increases in the federal inmate population have raised concerns from criminal justice experts and even among DOJ officials themselves. Michael Horowitz, the DOJ Inspector General, wrote a memorandum concerning this issue:

First, despite a slight decrease in the total number of federal inmates in fiscal year (FY) 2014, the Department projects that the costs of the federal prison system will continue to increase in the years ahead, consuming a large share of the Department's budget. Second, federal prisons remain significantly overcrowded and therefore face a number of important safety and security issues.

In an effort to address overpopulation, Director Marshall shared the BOP would expand the use of home confinement and place an emphasis on compliance with the First Step Act, a law where eligible inmates can earn up to 15 days off their sentence per month to reduce non-violent prison population.

=== COVID-19 pandemic ===
By July 30, 2020, there were 2,910 federal inmates and 500 BOP staff who had confirmed positive test results for COVID-19 during the nationwide COVID-19 pandemic. 7312 inmates and 683 staff have recovered. There have been 99 federal inmate deaths and two BOP staff member deaths attributed to COVID-19.

The BOP conducted executions during the pandemic that reportedly did not adhere to physical distancing rules, leading to criticism that the BOP was facilitating "superspreader" events. Staff reportedly refused to wear face masks, a violation of court orders, and knowingly withheld information about confirmed COVID-19 diagnoses from people who had interacted with infected individuals along with hindering contact tracing efforts and allowing staff members who had been exposed to COVID-19 to refuse testing and work. Public health experts called for a delay in executions as they could not be carried out safely without risking the spread of COVID-19.

== Line of duty deaths ==
According to ODMP, 33 officers of the BOP have been killed in the line of duty.

== See also ==
- Federal crime in the United States
- List of U.S. federal prisons
- List of United States federal law enforcement agencies
- National Institute of Corrections
- Federal Prison Industries, Inc. (UNICOR)

== Sources ==
- Arons, Anna, Katherine Culver, Emma Kaufman, Jennifer Yun, Hope Metcalf, Megan Quattlebaum, and Judith Resnik. "Dislocation and Relocation: Women in the Federal Prison System and Repurposing FCI Danbury for Men." Yale Law School, Arthur Liman Public Interest Program. September 2014.
