= Mark S. Inch =

United States army general

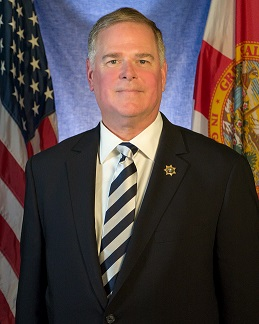
- Inch in 2019

Secretary of the Florida Department of Corrections
- In office January 8, 2019 – November 19, 2021
- Appointed by: Ron DeSantis
- Preceded by: Julie L. Jones
- Succeeded by: Ricky D. Dixon

9th Director of the Federal Bureau of Prisons
- In office September 18, 2017 – May 18, 2018
- Appointed by: Jeff Sessions
- President: Donald Trump
- Preceded by: Thomas R. Kane (acting)
- Succeeded by: Hugh J. Hurwitz (acting)

Personal details
- Born: Mark Sherwin Inch Boston, Massachusetts, U.S.
- Education: United States Army Command and General Staff College (MMASc); University of Texas at Austin (MGeog); Wheaton College (BA); Texas A&M University (BS)

Military service
- Allegiance: United States
- Branch/service: United States Army
- Years of service: 1982–2017
- Rank: Major General
- Commands: United States Army Provost Marshal General; United States Army Military Police School; United States Army Corrections Command; United States Disciplinary Barracks; 705th Military Police Battalion
- Battles/wars: Operation Gothic Serpent; War in Afghanistan; Iraq War
- Awards: Army Distinguished Service Medal; Defense Superior Service Medal; Legion of Merit (3); Bronze Star Medal

Mark Sherwin Inch is an American correctional officer and retired United States Army major general who served as the 9th Director of the Federal Bureau of Prisons of the United States. He resigned from that position on May 18, 2018.

U.S. Attorney General Jeff Sessions named Inch to head the Federal Bureau of Prisons in the Department of Justice (DOJ) on August 1, 2017. Inch, who also holds degrees in geography and archaeology, had supervised prisons of the United States Army for two years. Inch assumed office as Director of the Federal Bureau of Prisons on September 18, 2017. On January 3, 2019, Governor-elect Ron DeSantis of Florida announced that Inch would head the Florida Department of Corrections. On May 2, 2019, Inch was confirmed by the Florida Senate as the Secretary of Corrections. November 19, 2021 Inch announced his retirement and was replaced by Deputy Secretary Ricky D. Dixon.

== Education ==
- U.S. Army Command and General Staff College, Master's Degree, Military Operational Art and Science/Studies, 2004 – 2005
- University of Texas at Austin, Master's Degree, Geography (Regional Concentration: Middle East/Africa), (1992), Thesis: Decision-making and the implementation of security land use policies : a case study of Iraq – Summer 1990 to Summer 1992.
- Wheaton College, Bachelor's Degree, Biblical Archaeology, 1978 – 1982
