= Richard Comerford =

Secretary of the Florida Department of Corrections
- Incumbent
- Assumed office July 1, 2026
- Appointed by: Ron DeSantis
- Preceded by: Ricky D. Dixon

Personal details
- Education: University of Florida (BA)

Richard Comerford is an American correctional officer with over 40 years of experience at the Florida Department of Corrections (FDC). On July 1, 2026, Comerford was appointed Secretary of FDC by Governor Ron DeSantis. Comerford previously served as Deputy Secretary under Ricky D. Dixon, his predecessor.

== Education ==
Comerford graduated from the University of Florida with a Bachelor of Arts in Criminology. He is a member of the American Correctional Association, Florida Sheriffs Association, and North American Association of Wardens & Superintendents. He has also completed executive training through the Florida Department of Law Enforcement, National Institute of Corrections, Florida Emergency Management Agency, and American Correctional Association.

== Career ==
Comerford began his career with FDC as a correctional officer at Okaloosa Correctional Institution in 1986. Early in his career, Comerford served in a variety of supervisory, investigative, and command roles including multiple warden and assistant warden assignments across the State of Florida. In March 2011, Comerford was appointed Warden at Century Correctional Institution before being transferred to become Warden of Santa Rosa Correctional Institution in July 2012. In 2025, Comerford returned as Deputy Secretary to celebrate Century CI's reaccreditation by the American Correctional Association.

Comerford was later appointed Assistant Deputy Secretary of Institutions, where he oversaw the administration and management of Florida's correctional institutions, coordinated operational policies, security measures, recruitment, and staff incentives. In that role, Comerford defended changes to inmates' visitation rules put in place to curb the influx of contraband being introduced to FDC's facilities. As a part of that effort, FDC introduced video visitation to allow inmates an alternative when personal visitation isn't allowed.

In January 2022, Comerford was appointed Deputy Secretary, a position he held until being appointed Secretary in July 2026. There, Comerford focused on increasing the recruitment and retention of qualified correctional officers as FDC still relied on supplemental support from the Florida National Guard to fill urgent vacancies. On multiple occasions, Comerford spoke before the Florida Senate Criminal Justice panel on behalf of FDC. Comerford also worked to increase the number of programs available for inmates and the budget available for facility repairs, both of which he argued would improve the quality of life for both correctional officers and inmates. At one point, Comerford acknowledged that private prisons were ahead of the State in providing programming and education for inmates, but he argued that additional funding from the State Legislature would close the gaps and create "a level playing field when it comes to programming and education."

Comerford's accomplishments with FDC include presenting before the United States Department of Justice's Review Panel on Prison Rape, developing Florida's Rapid Response Team Program, and establishing FDC's centralized use of force review unit.

In July 2026, Comerford was nominated to serve on the American Correctional Association's Board of Governors.
