= Crew chief =

Crew chief may refer to:

- Crew Chief, the in-flight aircraft maintenance technician with various aircrew duties and responsibilities in a military aircraft
- Crew chief, the lead official in a basketball game
- Crew chief, the leader of the pit crew in NASCAR pit stops
- Crew chief, the most experienced baseball umpire in a crew
- Crew Chief, the real-time vehicle location and maintenance tracking application in the Ford Sync in-car entertainment
- Crew Chief, the lead load agent of an American Airlines ramp crew
