= Federal Home Loan Bank Board Building =

- U.S. National Register of Historic Places
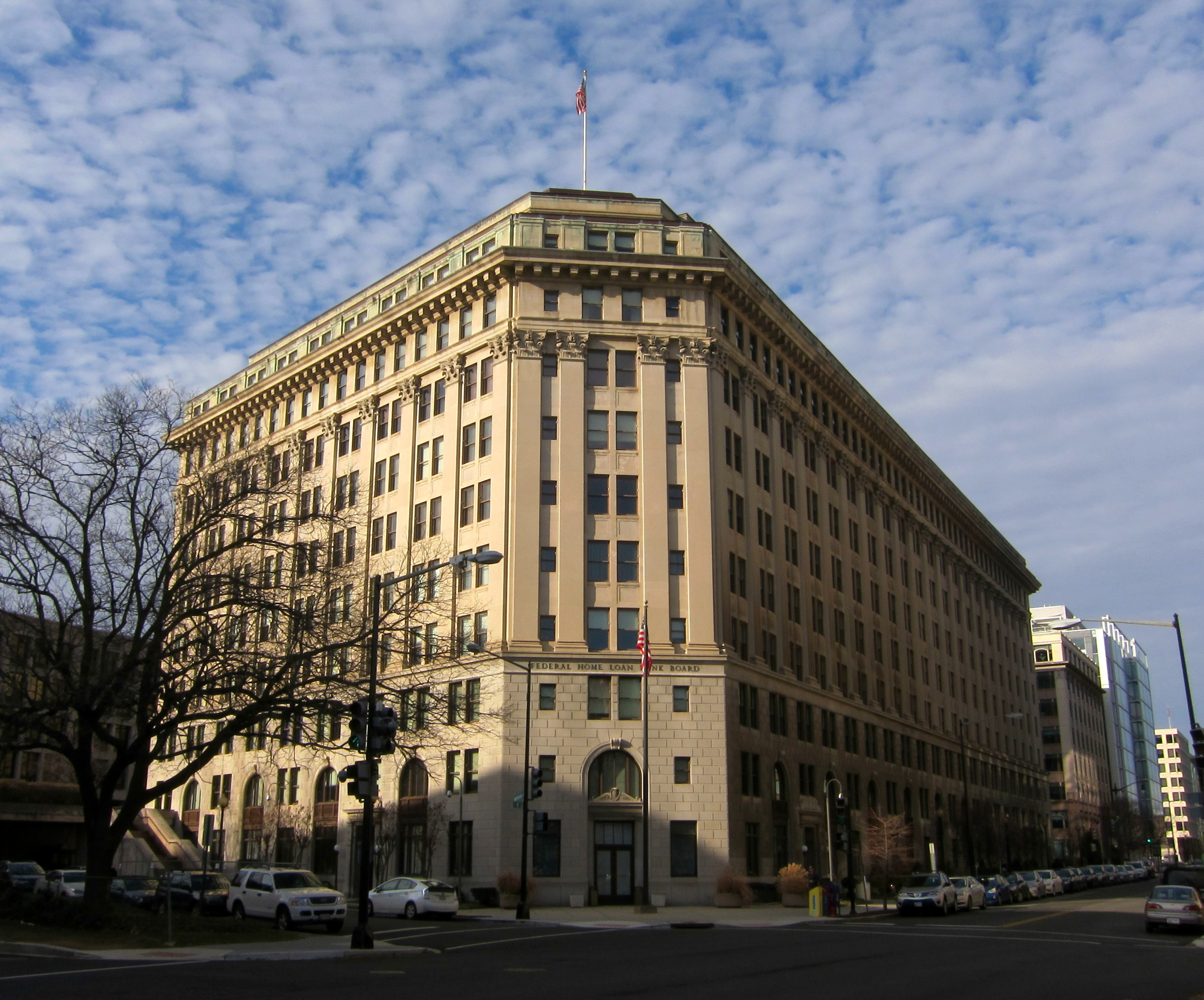
- Federal Home Loan Bank Board Building in 2017

- Location within Washington, D.C.
- Location: 320 1st Street, NW; Washington, D.C.
- Coordinates: 38°53′35″N 77°1′9″W
- Built: 1927–1928
- Architect: George E. Mathews; Louis A. Simon
- Architectural style: Classical Revival
- NRHP reference No.: 07000642
- Added to NRHP: July 3, 2007

The Federal Home Loan Bank Board Building is a historic structure located in Downtown Washington, D.C. It was listed on the National Register of Historic Places in 2007.

== History ==
The structure was built to house the Acacia Mutual Insurance Company, which was the only federally chartered life insurance company. It was incorporated in 1869 as the Masonic Mutual Relief Association of the District of Columbia. The Federal government took possession of the building in 1934 to house the Federal Home Loan Bank Board, which is how the building acquired its name in 1937. It was a New Deal program that supported home ownership.

== Architecture ==
George E. Mathews of the architectural firm of Hoggson Brothers was the original architect for the building. Louis A. Simon of the Public Works Branch in the Department of the Treasury was the architect for an addition that was built from 1935 to 1937. The building exemplifies early-20th-century Classical Revival intuitional office architecture. The exterior features facades covered with limestone with classical detail. The interior features an ornamented lobby.
