= Florida Commission on Offender Review =

State agency in Florida responsible for release from prison and clemency

The Florida Commission on Offender Review, commonly referred to as FCOR or the commission, was first known as the Pardon Board (created by the 1885 Florida Constitution) and then later, in 1941, the Florida Parole and Probation Commission. The commission is a Governor and Cabinet agency.

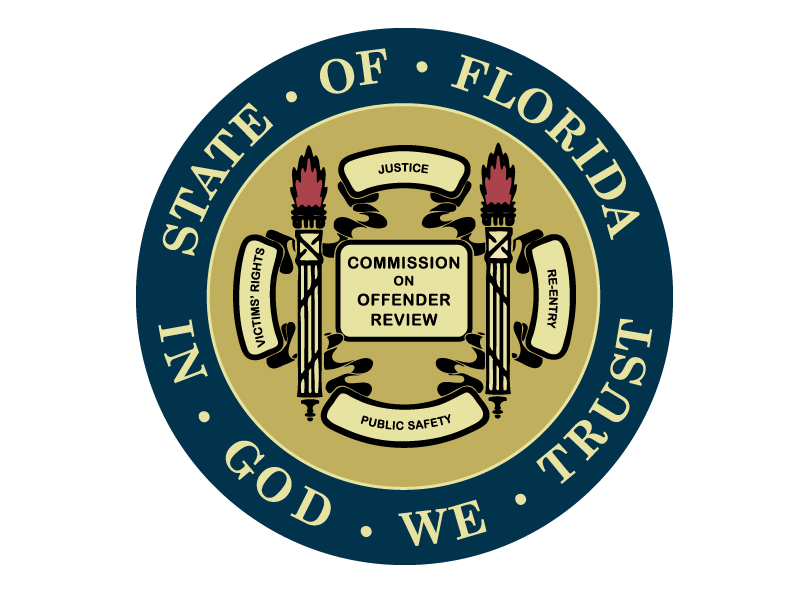
The official seal of the Florida Commission on Offender Review

== Overview ==
The commission is a quasi-judicial, decision-making body that makes post-release decisions affecting inmates and ex-offenders. The different types of release authorized by FCOR are parole, conditional release, conditional medical release, and addiction recovery supervision. Commissioners preside over approximately 36 meetings annually at the central office in Tallahassee and various locations throughout the state to encourage participation by victims, victims’ families, and inmates’ families who would otherwise not be able to attend. While offenders are not present at these hearings, the Commission provides a victim's coordinator and an inmate family coordinator to assist both parties during the proceedings. Commissioners make a variety of determinations regarding parole and other types of release during the hearings. In addition, the Commission reviews releasees’ supervision status every two years, or as directed by the commission.

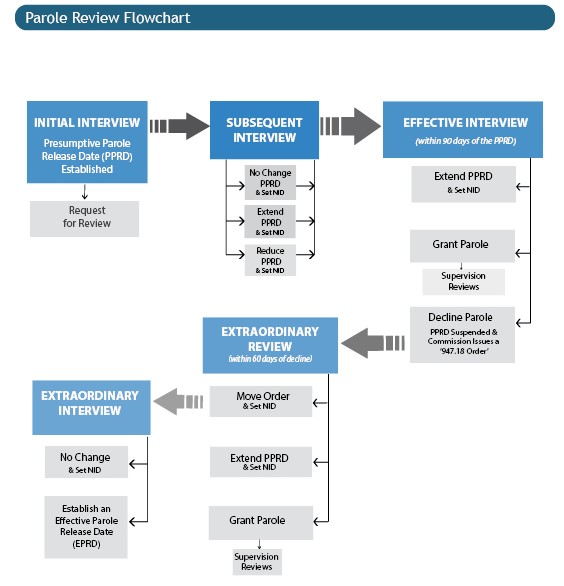
This a flowchart representing the parole process in Florida.

All Commission hearings are open to the public and no case decisions are made outside of the public meeting. Panel cases are decided by two (2) Commissioners and the full Commission involves three (3) Commissioners, as assigned by the chairman. Visiting Commissioners may be utilized, when assigned by the chairman, in the absence of a current sitting Commissioner or Commissioner-appointee. The Chairman decides on “split” cases (those cases where the two (2) panel Commissioners do not agree) at any point in time that same day after he/she has had the opportunity to review the cases in order.

Per the Sunshine Law (§ 947.06, F.S.), public meetings such as those held by the Commission must be noticed at least seven (7) days in advance. This is done by the commission's Office of the Commission Clerk. Prior to each meeting, an agenda is prepared and is made available on the commission's website. Members of the public, including inmate supporters. Victims, and others opposed to an inmate, attend the hearings and are given an opportunity to address the Commissioners. Each side is given 10 minutes to present information. Inmate supporters go first followed by those opposed.

General Structure of the Meetings:

- Invocation
- Pledge of Allegiance
- Instructions by the Chairman
- Visitor Cases: Panel Cases Presented, Full Commission Cases Presented
- Non-Visitor Cases: Panel Cases, Full Commission Cases
- Revocation Cases
- Reviewing/Setting Conditions on Conditional Release & Addiction Recovery cases (Panel Cases)

The commission is also the administrative arm of Executive Clemency. Clemency is the constitutionally authorized process that provides the means through which convicted felons may be considered for relief from punishment and seek restoration of their civil rights. The power to grant clemency is vested in the Governor with the agreement of two cabinet members who are also statewide elected officials. The Governor also has the sole power to deny clemency. There are seven types of clemency. They are full pardon, pardon without firearm authority, pardon for misdemeanor, commutation of sentence, remission of fines and forfeitures, specific authority to own, possess, or use firearms, and restoration of civil rights in Florida.

== Departments ==
The commission is composed of the following departments: Division of Operations (Office of the Commission Clerk, Revocations, Victims’ Services, Field Services), Division of Administration, Office of General Counsel, Office of Communications, Office of Legislative Affairs, Office of Executive Clemency, and the Office of Clemency Investigations.

== Locations ==
The commission has multiple offices throughout the state of Florida. The central office is in Tallahassee, with regional offices in Quincy, Jacksonville, Melbourne, Stuart, and Tampa
