= Platoon Leader (film) =

1988 film directed by Aaron Norris

- Directed by: Aaron Norris
- Screenplay by: Andrew Deutsch; Rick Marx; David L. Walker; Harry Alan Towers (adaptation)
- Based on: Platoon Leader by James R. McDonough
- Produced by: Harry Alan Towers
- Starring: Michael Dudikoff; Robert F. Lyons; Rick Fitts; Michael DeLorenzo; Tony Pierce; Jesse Dabson; William Smith
- Cinematography: Arthur Wooster
- Edited by: Michael J. Duthie
- Music by: George S. Clinton
- Production company: Breton Film Productions
- Distributed by: Cannon Films
- Release date: October 1988
- Running time: 97 minutes
- Country: United States
- Language: English
- Box office: $1,348,771 (US)

Platoon Leader is a 1988 war film set in the Vietnam War and directed by Aaron Norris; it stars Michael Dudikoff and Michael DeLorenzo and was filmed in South Africa. It is loosely based on James R. McDonough's memoir of the same name.

The film is about a newly commissioned infantry lieutenant who arrives in Vietnam to take over his first platoon. He finds he has to prove himself and earn the trust of the enlisted men if he is to lead them.

== Plot ==
Lieutenant Jeffrey Knight, newly graduated from the United States Military Academy, is airlifted to an outpost in Vietnam, where he meets the hard-bitten veterans of his new platoon. Platoon Sergeant McNamara explains they don't need a leader that follows rules and Knight's leadership is rejected by everyone save Private Parker, his radio operator.

Knight stumbles carelessly over a trip mine and is wounded on one of his first patrols. Major Flynn visits Knight in hospital and asks if he's up to returning. He agrees, but returns to the outpost to find his gear missing, since the platoon did not expect him to return. The men return his property but Knight realizes a different approach will be necessary to earn their respect.

During a firefight with Vietcong (VC) forces, Parker is hit by mortar fire and dies in Knight's arms. McNamara's squad drives the enemy into Sergeant Roach, considered the platoon's toughest soldier, who finishes the VC with his shotgun. The platoon receives replacements a week later, including a rebellious Private named Don Pike whose disruptiveness gets him assigned to Sergeant Roach's mine sweeping detail. Knight finds Private Bacera getting high in the barracks instead of leaving on patrol, destroys his stash of drugs and leads the patrol himself. Bacera dies of an overdose during the patrol.

Knight kills a night-time infiltrator in their camp, and deploys the platoon in defence of the outpost. Their flares reveal a large force of Viet Cong outside the wire. Despite Sergeant Hayes' claymores and airstrikes, the platoon suffers heavy casualties. Knight confesses doubts afterward about his ability to lead, but McNamara reassures him. The company commander, Captain Killinski, briefs the two platoon leaders on an attack on a Viet Cong battalion, and agrees when Knight suggests an alternate plan.

Knight's platoon moves into the jungle and McNamara is severely wounded in an ambush. Knight fights the platoon forward to retrieve McNamara for helicopter evacuation, then engages a company of VC that slipped through to attack the village. They push the VC back but mortar fire wounds Knight in the eye. When Roach finds a baby in one of the destroyed huts, they conclude the VC were targeting the villagers and not the soldiers.

Knight visits McNamara after the battle and explains they lost the village, but repelled the Viet Cong and is now starting to understand the meaning of the war. Weeks later, McNamara is greeted back at the base by Knight.

== Cast ==
- Michael Dudikoff as Lieutenant Jeffrey Knight
- Robert F. Lyons as Sergeant Michael McNamara
- Michael DeLorenzo as Private Raymond Bacera
- Jesse Dabson as Private Joshua Parker
- Rick Fitts as Sergeant Robert Hayes
- Tony Pierce as Private Jan Schultz
- Daniel Demorest as Private Duffy
- Brian Libby as Sergeant "Roach"
- Michael Rider as Private Don Pike
- William Smith as Major Flynn
- Al Karaki as Private Kemp
- Evan J. Klisser as Private Larsen
- Evan Barker as Captain Klinski
- A.J. Smith as Lieutenant Riley
- Dean Raphael Ferrandini as Medic
- Willie Olmstead as Medic (as Bill Olmstead)
- Themi Venturis as New Lieutenant
- Raymond Phoenix as Lieutenant
- Joyce Long as Mother With Child

== Box office release ==
Platoon Leader was released on October 1, 1988, and made $1.349 million in the United States.

== Critical reception ==
The film received mixed reviews, including criticism for being an imitation of Oliver Stone's 1986 war drama Platoon. After the film's DVD release in December 2017, Cinapse film review writer Ed Travis acknowledged the film's ambitions in terms of its direction and production. Travis also praised the film's leading man Michael Dudikoff "for turning in the best performance of his career by a substantial margin." He also wrote "There's absolutely no surprises. Nor is there really much of a hook. I guess the "point" is that leaders are made on the battlefield and not in the classroom. Or that being "in the shit" is what truly makes the man. The problem is that the viewer never for one second believes that Lt. Knight won't become the man his men need him to be. It's all very pre-determined and becomes a fairly dry watch with little to cause one to invest in the drama, while also eschewing lots of the Cannon Films trademark excess," and ended his review stating "At worst, it's boring. At best, it's sincere!" In that same month, Austin Trunick of Under the Radar Magazine wrote a similarly mixed review of the film writing "Do come in prepared for some of the usual chest-beating and flag-waving of the subgenre; the Viet Cong are treated mostly as faceless baddies only there to be blown up and shot up en masse in gratuitous slow motion. Expect bullets to hit three enemies at once, and single grenades to explode multiple times and in different locations." He also lent praise to Dudikoff's superior performance compared to Cannon films' contract star Chuck Norris; also known for his 1988 post-Vietnam War action film Braddock: Missing in Action III.
