= Platoon Leader (memoir) =

1985 memoir by James R. McDonough

- First edition
- Author: James R. McDonough
- Language: English
- Genre: Memoir
- Publisher: Presidio Press
- Publication date: 1985
- Publication place: United States
- Media type: Print (Hardback & Paperback)
- Pages: 208 pp
- ISBN: 0-89141-235-2
- OCLC: 11371326
- Dewey Decimal: 959.704/38 19
- LC Class: DS559.5 .M4 1985

Platoon Leader is a memoir by James R. McDonough. It is narrated by McDonough in first person view and tells of his story in the Vietnam War as a lieutenant in command of 2nd Platoon, Bravo Company, 4th Battalion, 503rd Airborne Infantry Regiment. It was loosely adapted into the 1988 film Platoon Leader.

== Plot introduction ==
Platoon Leader is a true story told by James R. McDonough, a Vietnam War veteran. The book takes place in and around a fort near a Vietnamese village in Binh Dinh province. It is McDonough's retelling of his time in Vietnam. He wrote the book as an officer development tool while he was a battalion commander.

== Plot summary ==
The author, James R. McDonough, introduces the book as a story of an "American platoon leader in combat". James McDonough begins the story with a brief introduction and the summary of his childhood in New York and decision to enter the United States Military Academy at West Point, New York. After graduating West Point, Ranger School, and infantry officer basic course, Lieutenant McDonough leaves his wife and infant son and deploys to Vietnam as part of the Vietnam War. Two of his classmates sit beside him on the flight over to the combat zone. After meeting a shell-shocked first lieutenant from the same unit to which he is assigned, he soon takes command of his first platoon.

McDonough soon meets Sergeant First Class Hernandez, his former Ranger school instructor and now platoon sergeant. Friction develops between the two after McDonough takes control during an attack on their platoon area of operations. Eventually Hernandez is transferred out of the platoon after a suspected assault on a female Viet Cong member who the platoon had taken as a prisoner of war.

He receives another platoon sergeant, Sergeant First Class Palloman who is a much better soldier relative to Hernandez, and is very willing to go on patrol. McDonough's unit continues to face combat from the Viet Cong, through ambushes while on patrol, and through conventional attacks on their base. During McDonough's last days with the platoon, the village the platoon is protecting is violently assaulted by the Viet Cong, and many civilians are killed. As McDonough leaves, he feels the War is and has been a lost cause.

McDonough faces a variety of morally ambiguous situations throughout the book. Eventually he completes his tour and returns home to his wife and son to continue his Army career.
