= Florida Department of Corrections =

State law enforcement agency

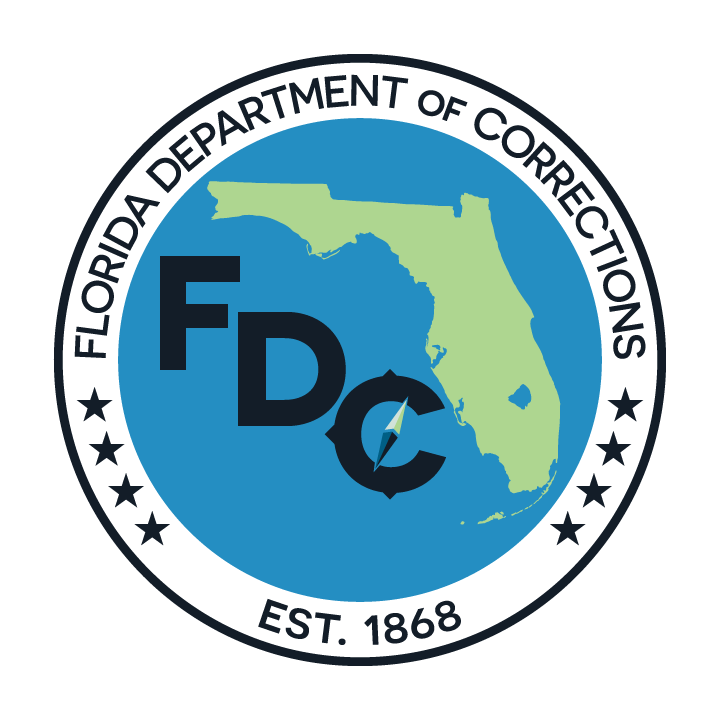
- Official seal of the Florida Department of Corrections

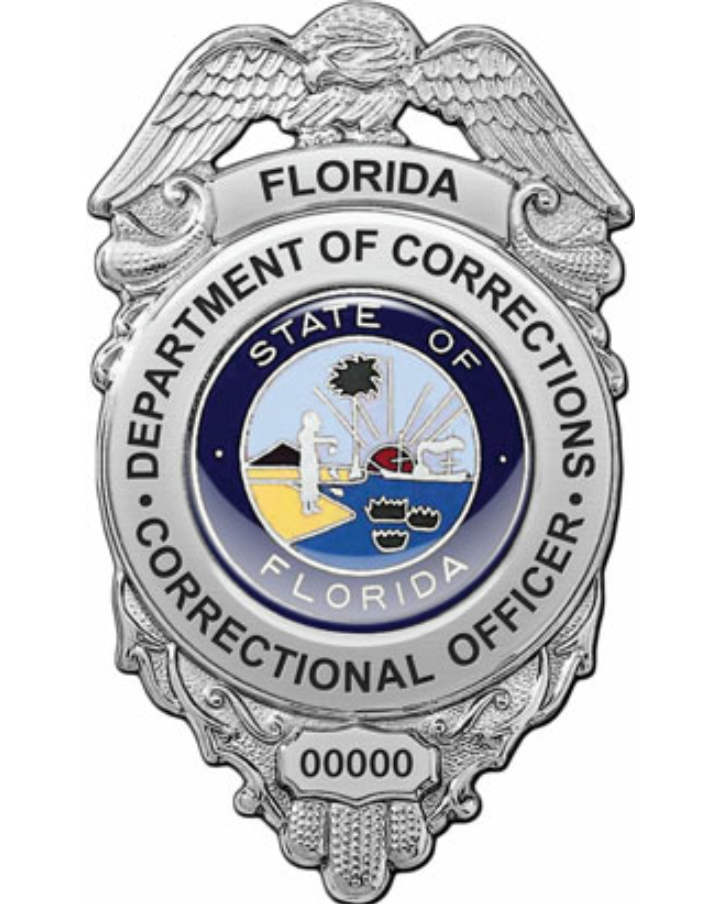
- Correctional Officer Badge
- Abbreviation: FDC
- Motto: "Inspiring success by transforming one life at a time." "We never walk alone."

Agency overview
- Formed: 1978
- Preceding agency: Florida Department of Offender Rehabilitation
- Employees: 23,752
- Annual budget: $3.8 billion

Operational structure
- Headquarters: Doyle Carlton Building, Tallahassee, Florida.
- Agency executives: Richard Comerford, Secretary; Vacant, Deputy Secretary; Dan Johnson, General Counsel; Kenneth Sumpter, Inspector General; Michelle Glady, Chief of Staff

Website
- www.dc.state.fl.us

The Florida Department of Corrections (FDC) is the state law enforcement agency responsible for operating state prisons in the U.S. state of Florida. It has its headquarters in the state capital of Tallahassee.

The Florida Department of Corrections operates the third largest state prison system in the United States. As of July 2022, FDC had an inmate population of approximately 89,000 and over 144,000 offenders in community supervision programs. It is the largest agency administered by the State of Florida with a budget of $3.3 billion.

The Department has 143 facilities statewide, including 43 major institutions, 33 work camps, 15 Annexes, 20 work release centers and 6 road prisons/forestry camps. It has almost 24,000 employees, about three-quarters of whom are either sworn certified corrections officers or sworn certified probation officers. The Department has K9 units statewide that are frequently utilized for tracking escapees and, in cases of small or rural law enforcement agencies, criminals who have fled from law enforcement or assisting in search and rescue for missing persons.

== History ==
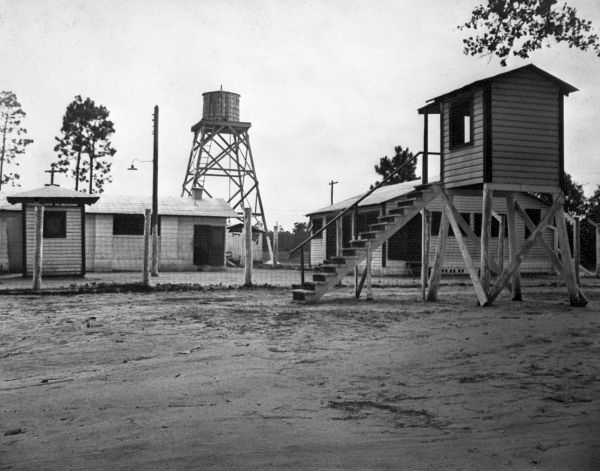
Water Towers at the Chattahoochee Arsenal

Governor Harrison Reed established Florida's first penitentiary in 1868 at the U.S. arsenal property at Chattahoochee (later the Florida State Hospital). The base's officer's quarters, a two-story brick building used in the Civil War, was chosen to serve as the prison.

At first, the prison was governed as a military operation under the supervision of the Florida Adjutant General. In 1871, the state legislature passed a law making the prison a civil organization rather than a military post. The Warden was paid $6 a day while watchmen were paid $2 a day. In 1877, supervision of inmates was placed under the control of the Commissioner of Agriculture. In 1895, the legislature passed a law allowing the Governor to appoint the first prison inspector at $125 per month.

=== Convict leasing system ===
Governor George Franklin Drew took office in January of 1877 and found the state in deep debt from Reconstruction. The Governor argued that prisoners should be economic assets to the state, beginning the convict lease system. Under this system, prisoners were leased to private corporations and individuals to work for them. The state was paid a fee from the leases and the private corporation or individual had to clothe, feed, house and provide medical care for the prisoner.

The program was initially very popular. People wanted criminals to be punished for their actions and earn their keep while incarcerated. Additionally, it was commonly believed at the time that hard work served as a deterrent against future crimes. The practice started slowly and became increasingly popular in the late 19th century as demand for cheap labor grew and because most people were unaware of the conditions and treatment of inmates in the convict lease system.

==== Martin Tabert ====
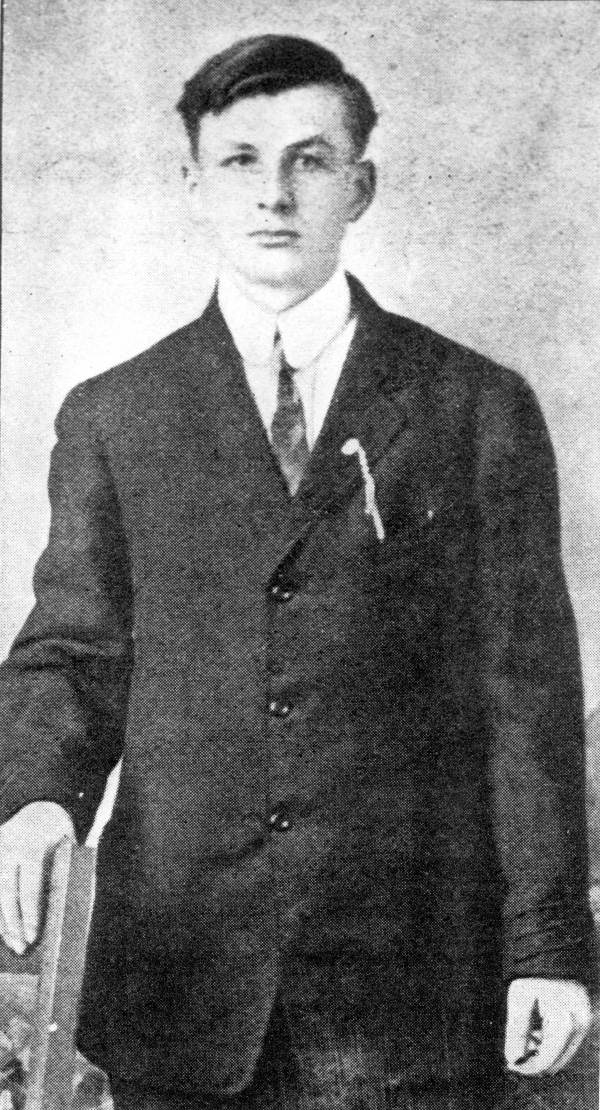
1921 portrait of Martin Tabert

Main Article: Martin Tabert

In December of 1921, 22-year-old Martin Tabert was arrested in Leon County for vagrancy. Tabert was ordered to pay $25 or spend three months at hard labor. His family immediately sent him $25 plus an additional $25 so he could return home, but through mishandling, the Leon County court never received the money. Tabert was sent to the Putnam Lumber Company in Dixie County as a part of the convict lease system, where he worked in the swamps cutting and clearing timber. In his time working for the Putnam Lumber Company, Tabert was subjected to physical abuse by the whipping boss, Walter Higginbotham, on a daily basis. When Tabert could no longer work due to injury and exhaustion, Higginbotham propped him up on his swollen feet and flogged him an estimated 50 times with a 5-foot leather strap. Tabert died that night.

In the aftermath of his death, Tabert's parents brought the case to the attention of those in charge in Tallahassee. The story gained national newspaper coverage and Higginbotham was tried for first-degree murder, but he was later acquitted. The Florida legislature immediately ordered a joint House-Senate committee to investigate Tabert's death and conduct a thorough investigation of all convict camps where cruelty had been charged. In a 31–1 vote held on April 20, 1923, the convict lease system was officially abolished. About a month later, the Senate passed a bill prohibiting the use of corporal punishment on county convicts. Governor Cary Hardee signed both bills into law.

=== Leadership of Leonard Chapman ===
In 1932, Leonard Chapman was appointed as the new warden at the State Prison Farm in Raiford, Florida. Chapman held this position for 25 years and implemented numerous reforms. Under his leadership, he introduced changes concerning improved health services, education, working habits, and contact with the community. Chapman forbade the word "convict" and instead encouraged the use of the term "inmate" for those in custody. He also introduced staff uniforms and grade school, including courses in carpentry, millwork, and plumbing. Solid barriers are also replaced by Chain-link fences so that inmates could see the outside world. By the end of the 1930s, horizontally striped inmate uniforms are also discontinued and all institutions are equipped with plumbing systems and electricity. In 1936, all wardens began fingerprinting inmates upon entry.

=== Florida Parole and Probation Commission ===
In 1941, an amendment to the Florida Constitution established the Florida Parole and Probation Commission (today the Florida Commission on Offender Review). The commission was created due to the limitations of the pardon system and was given the responsibility for granting paroles, supervising state probationers and parolees, and providing investigative services to the courts. The commission, consisting of a three-member board, replaced the existing State Board of Pardons, which had been previously chaired by the Governor. For the first time in the history of the United States, the Merit System was used to select the members of the commission.

=== World War II support ===
To aid the United States' war effort during World War II, inmates addressed and mailed ration books to Florida citizens. Additionally, they contributed $12,000 toward the purchase of war bonds. During this time period, the prison population significantly decreased as crime rates also decreased during the war. Several staff members were also called into military service, and the war contributed to some difficulty in securing materials needed in the operation of the state's prisons. In 1945, the use of leg irons for inmates as a form of discipline was prohibited.

=== Evolution into the Division of Corrections ===
In 1957, Governor LeRoy Collins, the State legislature, and correctional staff worked together to overhaul the state’s corrections system. As a result, the legislature enacted five major proposals totaling over $18 million. The most significant change resulting from the new Correctional Code was the establishment of the Division of Corrections, a centralized authority to oversee the entirety of the state’s corrections system. R.O. Culver was appointed as the first Director beginning on July 1, 1957. Under his leadership and the new Correctional Code, the general philosophy shifted from punishment to correction and rehabilitation. Also in this year, the first Classification Staff were hired at Florida State Prison and a card system for inmate records was implemented. The next year, the use of sweat boxes was prohibited as a form of punishment.

On July 2, 1959, H.G. Cochran, Jr. was appointed to succeed Culver as Director of the Division of Corrections. During his tenure, the state’s corrections system continued to modernize and introduce more professional practices. In 1959, the first Transition Officers were hired to help inmates with placement after they were released. In 1960, a new six-digit numbering system to identify inmates was implemented. In 1961, the official newsletter for the Division of Corrections, the Correctional Compass, debuted. Also that year, complete control of the state’s Road Prison operation was transferred from the State Road Department to the Division of Corrections.

== Death Row Operations ==
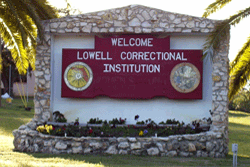
Lowell Correctional Institution

Male inmates on death row are housed at either the Florida State Prison or Union Correctional Institution, while female inmates on death row are housed at the Lowell Correctional Institution Annex. At some point the Broward Correctional Institution housed female death row inmates, but the female death row was moved to the Lowell Annex in February 2003. Unlike other prisoners, inmates on death row wear orange over shirts but still wear the same blue trousers worn by other inmates.

Florida administers executions by electric chair or lethal injection. The three-legged electric chair was constructed from oak by Department of Corrections personnel in 1998 and was installed at Florida State Prison in Starke in 1999. The executioner is a private citizen who is paid $150 per execution. State law allows for his or her identity to remain anonymous.

== Inmate population statistics ==
Pursuant to F.S. 944.151(3), the Department of Corrections must annually report their maximum capacity, current population, and condition of their facilities' infrastructure to identify specific needs, if any, to the state legislature and the Governor.

=== Demographics ===
As of June 30, 2022, 93.6% of inmates in Florida were male and 6.4% were female. Of the male inmates, 48.5% were black, 38% were white, and 13% were Hispanic. Of the female inmates, 63.8% were white, 28.4% were black, and 0.7% were Hispanic.

General Characteristics by Offense Type
Type of Offense	Number	Percent	Avg. Sentence Length	Avg. Age at Offense
Murder, Manslaughter	15,440	18.8%	36.7 years	28.5
Sexual Offenses	12,304	15.0%	25.5 years	34.6
Burglary	11,387	13.9%	15.9 years	31.3
Drug Offenses	11,008	8.3%	8.3 years	36.2
Violent Personal Offenses	10,633	13.0%	14.4 years	32.1
Robbery	9,654	11.8%	23.4 years	27.4
Weapons	3,997	4.9%	7.4 years	31.3
Theft/Forgery/Fraud	3,781	4.6%	6.4 years	37.3
Other	3,920	4.8%	7.1 years	37.2

=== Recidivism ===
The Florida Department of Corrections defines recidivism as a return to prison, as the result of either a new conviction or a violation of post-prison supervision, within three years of their prison release date. The Department began releasing annual recidivism reports in 2012. According to the Department's most recent report, the recidivism rate for the 2019 release cohort was 21.2%.

Recidivism Rates Over Time
	1–12 Months	13–24 Months	25–36 Months	Total
2008	10.2%	10.3%	7.1%	27.7%
2009	9.6%	9.7%	7%	26.3%
2010	8.8%	9.6%	7.3%	25.7%
2011	8.3%	10%	7.8%	26.2%
2012	8.0%	9.6%	7.5%	25.2%
2013	8.6%	9.3%	7.4%	25.4%
2014	9.4%	9.4%	7%	24.5%
2015	8.5%	9.2%	7.1%	24.7%
2016	8.4%	9.4%	7.6%	25.4%
2017	8.5%	9.6%	5.9%	24.1%
2018	8.4%	7.4%	5.3%	21.2%
2019	6.3%	6.8%	8.2%	21.2%
2020	4.7%	8.7%		

=== Juveniles ===
As of October 2023, there were between 50 and 60 inmates under the age of 17 in the custody of the Department of Corrections. Female juvenile delinquents are housed at Lowell Correctional Institution and males at Suwannee Correctional Institution.

== Budget ==
According to the 2023 Criminal Justice Impact Conference, it costs approximately $28,855 per year to incarcerate an inmate in Florida. This includes $2.32 per day for 2,800 calorie meals. According to §960.293, Florida Statutes, inmates may be charged $50 for every day of their sentence or $250,000 for a life sentence.

=== 2011 budget cuts ===
In first quarter 2011, the State of Florida announced the closing of 6 institutions in order to save up to $30 million. Three prisons, two bootcamps, and a road prison were closed. Brevard Correctional Institution, which is a youthful offender prison, Lowell Boot Camp, a youthful offender female boot camp, Sumter Basic Training Unit, a youthful offender male boot camp, Hendry Correctional Institution, the female prison Hillsborough Correctional Institution, and Tallahassee Road Prison were the institutions that were closed. No inmates were released as a result of the closing, and the employees of the closing institutions were offered jobs at other prisons. The institutions began moving inmates on April 1, 2011, and finished as of June 30, 2011. Hillsborough Correctional Institution and Sumter BTU were not closed.

Governor Rick Scott ordered a second group of prisons to be closed. The Department stated that aside from the financial reasons, they were being closed due to a declining prison population. The following prisons were closed:

- Broward Correctional Institution
- Demilly Correctional Institution
- Gainesville Correctional Institution
- Hillsborough Correctional Institution (large amount of pleas caused closing to be postponed after the initial announcement)
- Indian River Correctional Institution
- New River Correctional Institution (both units)
- River Junction Work Camp
- Caryville Work Camp
- Hendry Work Camp
- Levy Forestry Camp

== Staffing ==
As of June 30, 2022, the Florida Department of Corrections (FDC) had a total of 23,525 employees. The department had 17,498 certified criminal justice officers in institutions or probation/parole offices. Florida Correctional Officers start at $48,620. Recruits are paid while they attend recruit training, and Officers can transfer anywhere in the State with FDC. Opportunities include K9 Team, Correctional Emergency Response Team (CERT), Rapid Response Team (RRT), and Institutional Inspectors.

The Florida Department of Corrections is constantly hiring to fill its ranks due to retirements, and turnovers. Due to staffing shortages after the COVID-19 Pandemic, the Florida National Guard was brought in to fill vacancies at institutions across the state. Governor Ron DeSantis initially issued the order in 2022, but he extended it four times. The National Guard stayed until the summer of 2025, when it was announced that staffing levels at the Department had reached a stable level.

=== Ranks, insignia, and uniforms ===
In 2017, Florida Corrections Officers changed the traditional Light Brown shirts and dark brown trousers to Gray shirts and black trousers. The polo shirt was discontinued and FDC went back to gray button up shirts with breathable backs. In 2020 the polo shirts with embroidered badges and names were again authorized in a dark gray for Officers and Sergeants, and white for Lieutenants and Captains.

Rank	Insignia
Correctional Officer Colonel	
Correctional Officer Major	
Correctional Officer Captain	
Correctional Officer Lieutenant	
Correctional Officer Sergeant	
Correctional Officer	
Correctional Officer (trainee)	

== Agency Administration and Organization ==
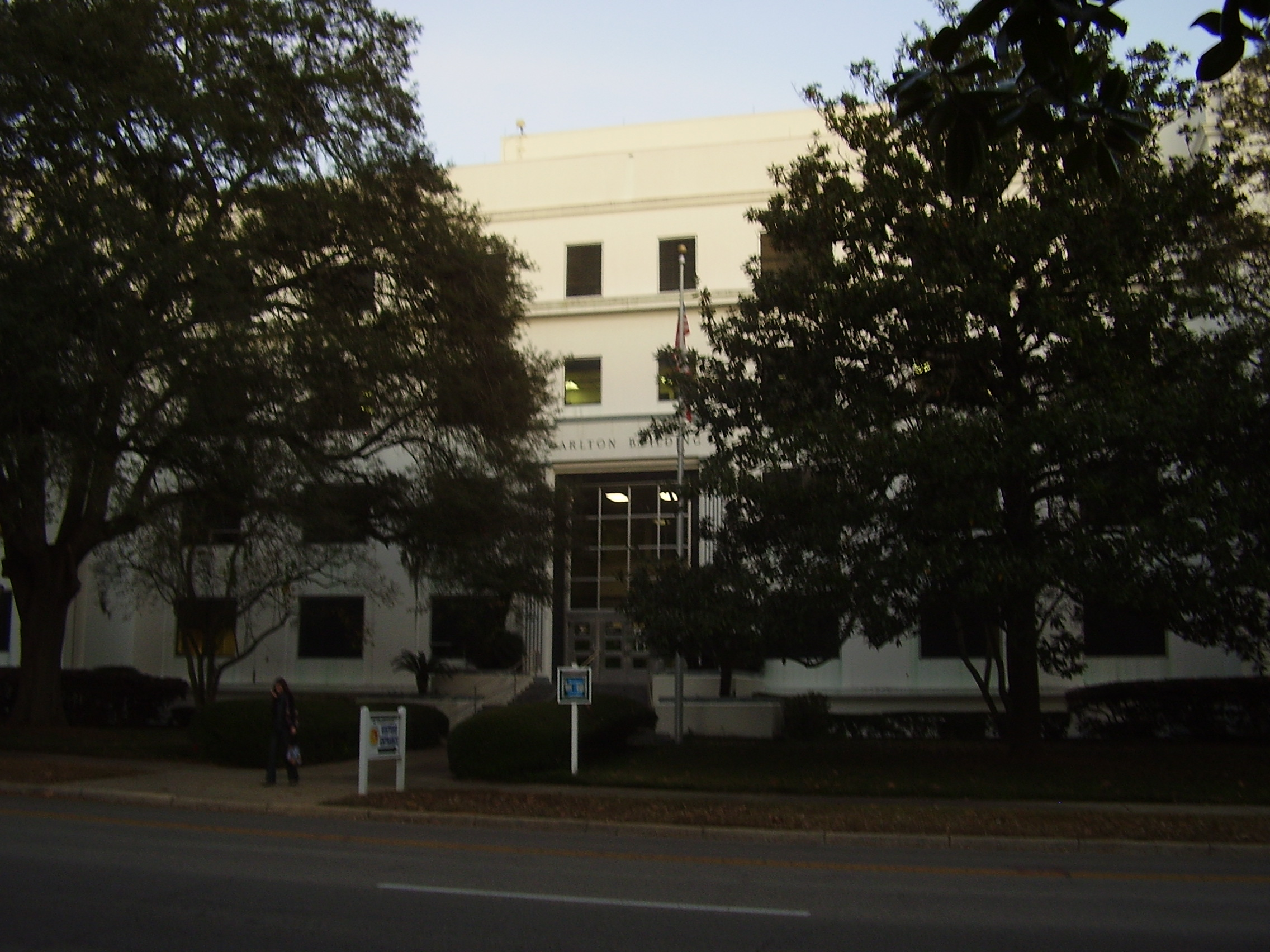
Doyle Carlton Building, current headquarters

=== Agency Administration ===
The Department is led by Secretary Richard Comerford, who has held the position since July of 2026. Comerford was previously Deputy Secretary, but the position is currently vacant. The Chief of Staff is Michelle Glady, the General Counsel is Dan Johnson, and the Inspector General is Kenneth Sumpter.

Position	Name
Secretary	Richard Comerford
Deputy Secretary	Vacant
Chief of Staff	Michelle Glady
General Counsel	Dan Johnson
Inspector General	Kenneth Sumpter

=== Agency Organization ===
The Department is organized into four regions that cover the entirety of the state. Each region has its own director to manage operations within their jurisdiction. Within each region, jurisdictions are further organized into circuit offices, of which there are 20 in the state. These circuits align with the state's twenty judicial circuits. All offices report to the Central Office in Tallahassee, which provides support, policy, and oversight through the regional directors and their staff to all the facilities.. The Department directly oversees 135 facilities statewide, including 49 major institutions, 16 annexes, 7 contractor operated facilities, 28 work camps, 2 re-entry centers, 2 road prisons/forestry camps, 1 basic training camp, 9 FDC operated work release centers along with 21 work-release centers operated by various private vendors. As of October 1, 2023, these contracts are executed and managed by the Department.

The headquarters of the agency are in the Doyle Carlton Building in downtown Tallahassee, known as Central Office. Some offices are in the Southwood Office Complex in Tallahassee. In 2011, the department moved into its current headquarters and office buildings. The Department's headquarters were previously at 2601 Blair Stone Road in Tallahassee.

== Fallen officers ==
Since the establishment of the Florida Department of Corrections, 39 correctional officers have died in the line of duty. Corrections Officers are frequently placed in dangerous situations where officers have lost lives. The Department has a standing memorial to officers who have died in the line of duty at the Wakulla Correctional Institution where the names of the fallen are carved into the memorial.

FDC Line of Duty Deaths
	Name	Date of death	Manner of Death
1	Captain Ike Steel	September 6, 1928	Stabbed
2	Correctional Officer Rufus W. Waters	July 22, 1938	Gunfire
3	Correctional Officer William Henry Hunt	August 28, 1945	Gunfire
4	Correctional Officer W.R. Brandon	August 20, 1948	Gunfire
5	Correctional Officer Grant Dohner	January 15, 1953	Assault
6	Correctional Officer John F. Gradon	February 1, 1953	Assault
7	Assistant Superintendent James G. Godwin	April 4, 1955	Gunfire
8	Sergeant Howard D. Starling	July 4, 1964	Heart Attack
9	Correctional Officer Lester B. Sumner	April 26, 1965	Stabbed
10	Captain James W. Parr, Sr.	August 11, 1966	Drowned
11	Parole Officer William F. Gambill	July 11, 1973	Automobile Crash
12	Correctional Officer Paul Jordan	January 24, 1976	Heart Attack
13	Correctional Officer Lauriston F. Hustus	July 16, 1980	Heart Attack
14	Correctional Officer Richard James Burke	October 12, 1980	Stabbed
15	Probation Supervisor Bjorn Thomas Svenson	August 31, 1982	Gunfire
16	Correctional Officer Donald L. Pawlizak	April 21, 1983	Accidental
17	Sergeant John S. Dennard	May 5, 1983	Stabbed
18	Parole Officer Michael Peter Serano	January 6, 1984	Automobile Crash
19	Correctional Officer Fred Sidney Griffis	June 24, 1987	Gunfire
20	Correctional Officer Hoyt L. Ergle	December 15, 1987	Gunfire
21	Lieutenant Charles Andrew Cooper	September 15, 1988	Heart Attack
22	Sergeant Kenneth M. Hendrick	January 28, 1993	Heart Attack
23	Correctional Officer Lee Charles Dunn	January 24, 2000	Automobile Crash
24	Correctional Officer Darla Kay Lathrem	June 11, 2003	Assault
25	Correctional Officer Donna Fitzgerald	June 25, 2008	Stabbed
26	Correctional Officer Adam Sanderson	March 6, 2009	Vehicular Assault
27	Colonel Gregory Malloy	February 2, 2011	Gunfire
28	Sergeant Ruben Howard Thomas III	March 18, 2012	Stabbed
29	Sergeant Jorge Ramos	May 1, 2016	Heart Attack
30	Sergeant Joseph Ossman	September 10, 2017	Automobile Crash
31	Correctional Officer Tawanna V. Marin	June 18, 2018	Struck by Vehicle
32	Sergeant Robert Wayne Rogers	July 31, 2020	COVID-19
33	Correctional Officer Jack Sale Stewart	February 13, 2021	COVID-19
34	Correctional Officer William Fox	March 4, 2021	COVID-19
35	Inspector John Annarumma	March 6, 2021	COVID-19
36	Sergeant Derek Stewart	April 28, 2021	COVID-19
37	Correctional Officer Trainee Whitney Cloud	August 28, 2021	Gunfire (Inadvertent)
38	Correctional Officer Kelly Jo Klimkowski	September 28, 2021	COVID-19
39	Correctional Officer James Alexander Jackson	August 15, 2025	Heat stroke

== Criticism ==
There have been several recorded cases of corruption and prisoner abuse in the Florida Department of Corrections.

In 2007, the state faced lawsuits alleging "excessive as well as 'malicious and sadistic' use of pepper spray," and "that its prisons subject too many inmates, including the mentally ill, to a prisoner 'warehousing' culture of unlawfully extreme isolation and deprivation, usually with little or no rehabilitation efforts to prevent recidivism."

In 2010, there was a 10-count federal indictment against sixteen individuals connected with the FDC, eleven of whom were corrections officers at the Glades Correctional Institution. The charges included "nine counts of attempting to possess cocaine with intent to distribute." The indictment alleges that the defendants "allegedly agreed to transport and did in fact transport on multiple occasions what they believed to be multi-kilo quantities of cocaine from the undercover warehouses in Miami-Dade County to locations in West Palm Beach", and that the defendants allegedly received a combined total of $145,000 through the drug scheme.

In 2010, two correctional officers at the Lancaster Correctional Institution were charged with malicious battery and cruel or inhumane punishment after an inmate collapsed in the exercise yard during routine drills. An investigation discovered that the correctional officers forced the inmate to perform strenuous exercises in the sand, heat and provided no water breaks while denying his request for medical help and failed to call for emergency help after the inmate collapsed. The inmate was in critical condition, but has since recovered.

In 2014, a series of investigative reports from the Miami-Herald revealed that in June 2012, a mentally ill prisoner was forced into a locked shower by staff at Dade Correctional Institution. After more than an hour in the hot water, Darren Rainey died from his injuries. In 2017, Miami-Dade State Attorney Katherine Fernández Rundle chose not to charge the correctional officers involved, citing the results of the autopsy and inconsistent witness statements. Nonetheless, FDC and the State of Florida settled with Rainey's family for $4.5 million in 2018.

== See also ==
- List of Florida state prisons
- List of law enforcement agencies in Florida
- Crime in Florida
- Incarceration in Florida
