= Bruce Thompson (California politician) =

American politician

Member of the California State Assembly from the 66th district
- In office December 5, 1994 - November 30, 2000
- Preceded by: Ray Haynes
- Succeeded by: Dennis Hollingsworth

Personal details
- Born: November 24, 1953 (age 72) Weiser, Idaho, US
- Party: Republican
- Spouse: Donna (m. 1974)
- Children: 8

Bruce Charles Thompson (born November 24, 1953) is a Republican politician from California. He served in the California State Assembly, representing the 66th Assembly district from 1994 until he was termed out in 2000. He is a graduate of San Dimas High School and holds a Bachelors Degree from the University of LA Verne.

== Pre Assembly career ==
Prior to serving in the Assembly, Thompson owned and operated several successful businesses, including a marble import company, importing construction marble tiles and slabs from Malaysia. He served on the Fallbrook Union Elementary School District board from 1992 until his election to the State Assembly. He served on the Riverside, CA Rubidoux Community Services District board from 1980 to 1988.

== 1994 Assembly career ==
Thompson won the Republican primary by a significant margin in 1994. One of his opponents was future Assemblymember Kevin Jeffries who later won the seat in 2006. He served in several Republican leadership positions while in the Assembly, including Caucus Chair and Assistant Republican Leader.

== Assembly career ==
He served on Assembly committees overseeing education, natural resources and water, parks and wildlife.

== Post Assembly career ==
Thompson worked along with Condoleezza Rice as one of six California team members for the Bush/Cheney 2000 campaign. He was later appointed by President George W. Bush as the Region IX Administrator for the U.S. Small Business Administration where he served from 10/01 to 01/09. Thompson was a delegate to the 2000 Republican National Convention in Philadelphia, PA and the 2008 Republican National Convention in St. Paul, MN. In 2012 Thompson served as a regional campaign manager for Mitt Romney and was a 3rd time delegate at the 2012 Republican National Convention.

Since 2011 Thompson has served as President of Regional Centers Holding Group, one of the most successful and unique EB-5 business operations in the US. In 2015 he was appointed as president for Sunstone Management, a private equity firm and sister company of Regional Centers Holding Group. He was invited as a guest lecturer by the following Chinese universities: Peking University, Tsinghua University, University of International Business and Economics, and Central University of Finance and Economics. He was also invited to speak at the only Chinese government think tank “Development Research Center of the State Council” (DRCSC) on US Small Business Policies and SBA in 2011. His presentation received strong positive feedback and has made significant impact on Small Business legislation in China.

== Personal ==
The Thompsons live in Fallbrook, CA and have eight married adult children and 31 grandchildren. They are members of the Church of Jesus Christ of Latter-Day Saints.

Political offices
Preceded by Ray Haynes	California State Assemblymember, 66th District; December 5, 1994 - November 30, 2000	Succeeded by Dennis Hollingsworth
