= Jeff Hewitt (politician) =

American politician (born 1953)

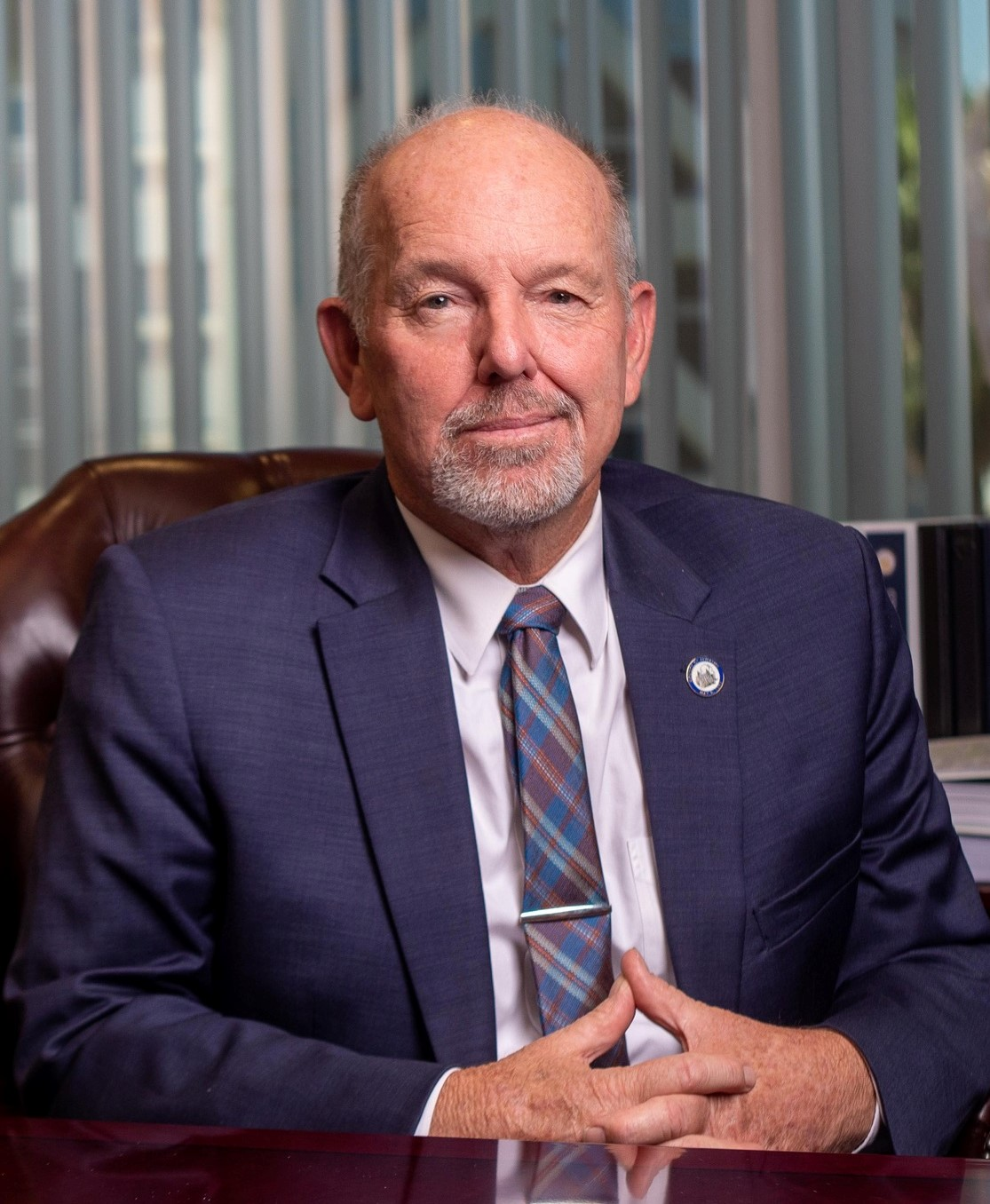
- Hewitt in 2021

Chair of the Riverside County Board of Supervisors
- In office January 11, 2022 – January 10, 2023
- Vice Chair: Kevin Jeffries
- Preceded by: Karen Spiegel
- Succeeded by: Kevin Jeffries

Vice Chair of the Riverside County Board of Supervisors
- In office January 12, 2021 – January 11, 2022
- Chair: Karen Spiegel
- Preceded by: Karen Spiegel
- Succeeded by: Kevin Jeffries

Member of the Riverside County Board of Supervisors from the 5th district
- In office January 8, 2019 – January 10, 2023
- Preceded by: Marion Ashley
- Succeeded by: Yxstian Gutierrez

Member of the Libertarian National Committee from the 4th region
- In office April 2, 2016 – May 29, 2022
- Preceded by: Daniel Wiener
- Succeeded by: Carrie Eiler

Mayor of Calimesa
- In office December 11, 2015 – December 20, 2018
- Preceded by: Joyce McIntire
- Succeeded by: Bill Davis

Member of the Calimesa City Council
- In office December 7, 2010 – December 20, 2018

Personal details
- Born: Jeffrey Hewitt; 1953 (age 72–73) Redlands, California, U.S.
- Party: Libertarian
- Spouse: Wendy Hewitt
- Children: 6
- Website: Official website; Government website

Jeffrey Hewitt (born 1953) is an American politician who served on the Riverside County Board of Supervisors from 2019 to 2023, and as its chair from 2022 to 2023. A member of the Libertarian Party, Hewitt previously served on the Calimesa City Council and as the city's mayor.

Hewitt was elected to the Calimesa city council in the 2010 election and reelected in the 2014 election before being selected by the city council to become mayor in 2015. He unsuccessfully ran for a seat in the California State Senate and California State Assembly in the 2014 and 2016 elections. Hewitt was elected to the board of supervisors despite being outspent and was labeled as the most powerful elected Libertarian in the United States by the Los Angeles Times. He ran in the 2021 California gubernatorial recall election with the support of the Libertarian Party of California.

== Calimesa City Council (2010–2018) ==
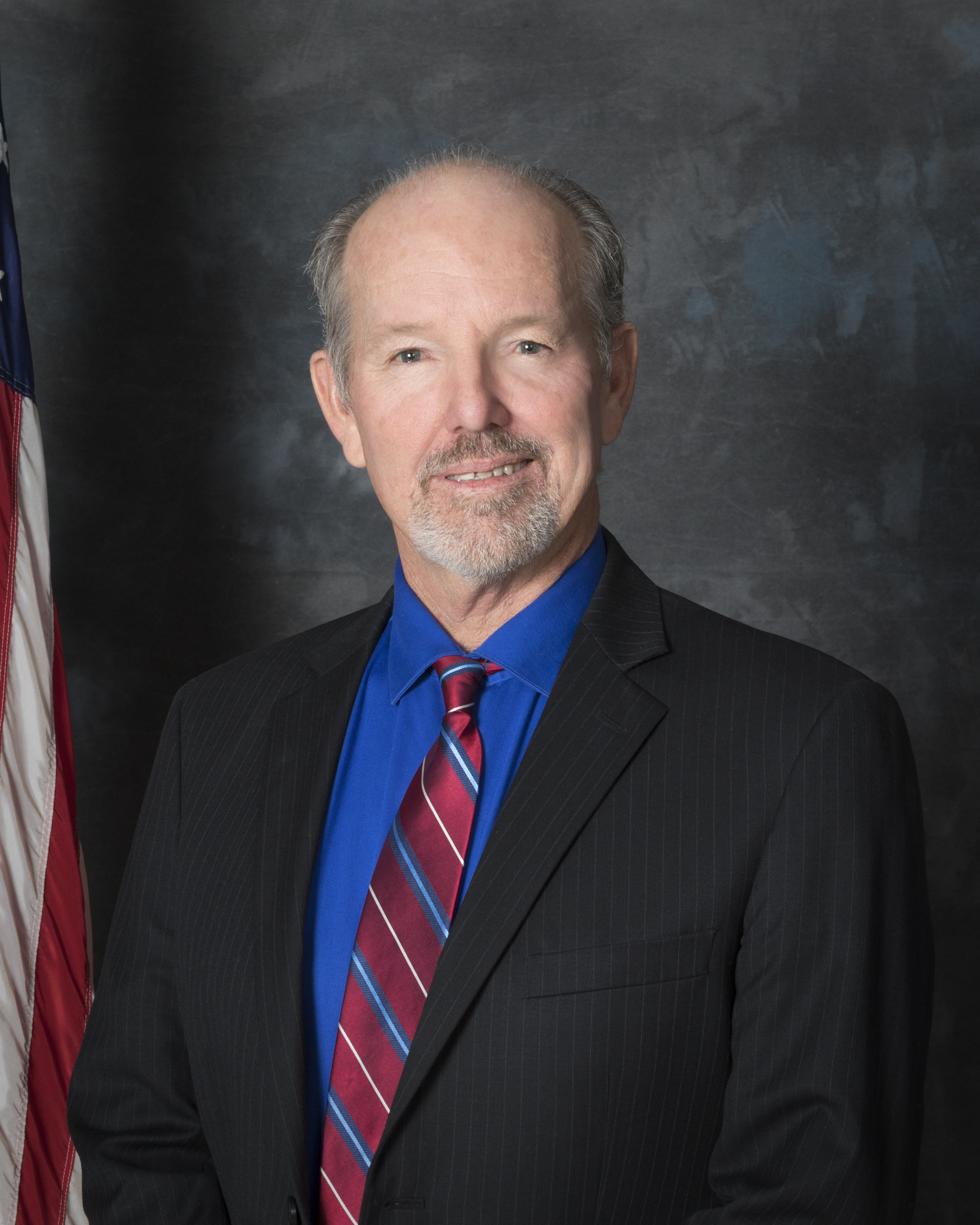
Hewitt as Mayor of Calimesa

Hewitt was elected to the Calimesa City Council on November 2, 2010, and sworn in on December 7. He was appointed to a second four-year term by the Council in 2014. The council unanimously elected Hewitt Mayor on December 11, 2015, succeeding Joyce McIntire.

In 2018, Hewitt limited Calimesa's contract with the California Department of Forestry and Fire Protection (Cal Fire) to circumvent the state's union requirements. In its place, Calimesa established its own fire department that was free to offer 401(k) retirement plans to its employees in lieu of the pensions required by the Cal Fire union, which had accounted for a large portion of the city's budget. The change also allowed Calimesa to reduce its staffing levels on fire trucks. Hewitt argued that the staffing levels mandated by Riverside County cities with Cal Fire contracts were unnecessarily high, and claims cost cuts made possible by the switch to a city-run fire department saved Calimesa from bankruptcy.

Hewitt resigned from the council on December 20, 2018, after being elected to the Riverside County Board of Supervisors in November. He was succeeded by Bill Davis.

== Riverside County Supervisor (2019–2023) ==
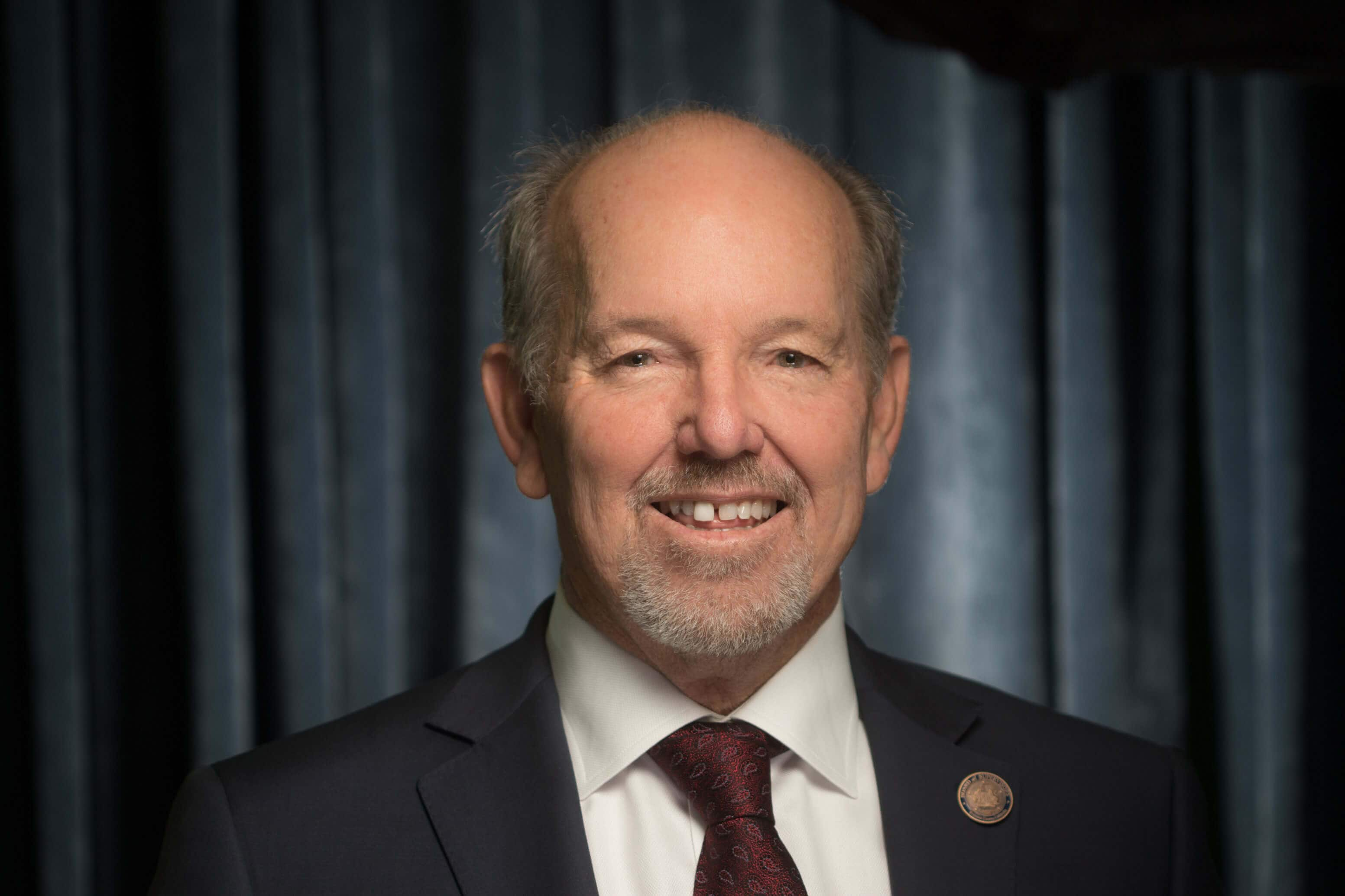
Hewitt's official portrait, 2019

In an upset victory, Hewitt was elected to the Riverside County Board of Supervisors from District 5 in 2018 against former Republican Assemblyman Russ Bogh, despite Bogh raising twice as much money as Hewitt. Hewitt was sworn into office as a supervisor on January 8, 2019, by Libertarian National Committee Chair Nicholas Sarwark, succeeding retiring supervisor Marion Ashley. In 2018, the Los Angeles Times named Hewitt as the most powerful Libertarian ever elected in the United States, though according to Reason he has since been surpassed by Wyoming State Representative Marshall Burt.

Amid the California government response to the COVID-19 pandemic, Hewitt pushed Riverside County to reopen its businesses more quickly than the rest of California. In September 2020, Hewitt introduced legislation to establish restrictions specific to Riverside County, which would've been looser than those set by the state. The legislation would've allowed some indoor services that had been ordered closed to reopen with capacity limits, including restaurants, gyms, hair salons, places of worship, movie theaters, libraries, and retailers. Hewitt's proposal would have reopened the County fully by November 3, with large events being permitted starting on October 13. Due to a threat by Governor Gavin Newsom to cut state funding to counties that did not follow his guidelines for reopening, Hewitt's plan had the potential to cost Riverside County between $28 million and $656 million in state funding. Hewitt argued that the additional tax revenue gained from reopening the County would offset any loss of state funds. On September 22, the Board of Supervisors voted 3–2 to advance Hewitt's proposal, but delayed its implementation to October. On October 6, the Board voted 4–1 to enact a modified version of Hewitt's plan, with Hewitt as the sole opposing vote. Hewitt says he voted against the final version because the specific deadlines in his original proposal had been removed, and language had been added directing the County to cooperate with the state on reopening guidelines.

In November 2020, a female county employee filed a lawsuit against the county which accused Hewitt of sexual harassment back in May 2020. Riverside County settled the lawsuit in connection with the allegation for $50,000 in April 2021. Later that month, another female county employee filed suit against the county, and accused Hewitt and his chief of staff of making "disparaging and vulgar comments" back in October 2020.

On January 12, 2021, Hewitt was elected by the board to serve as its vice chair for the year. He succeeded Karen Spiegel, who was elected Chair. On January 12, 2022, Hewitt was elected by the board to serve as its chair for the year, with Kevin Jeffries elected Vice Chair. In an unusual move, supervisors Chuck Washington and V. Manuel Perez, both Democrats, abstained from voting on the 2022 appointments. Such votes have been unanimous for at least the last two decades, with the positions rotated annually by district. Washington has also endorsed Hewitt's 2022 re-election challenger, Democratic mayor Yxstian Gutierrez of Moreno Valley, potentially the first such endorsement by a sitting supervisor against a colleague. Hewitt and Gutierrez advanced from the top-two primary on June 7, 2022. Hewitt lost re-election to Gutierrez in the general election.

== Other political activities ==
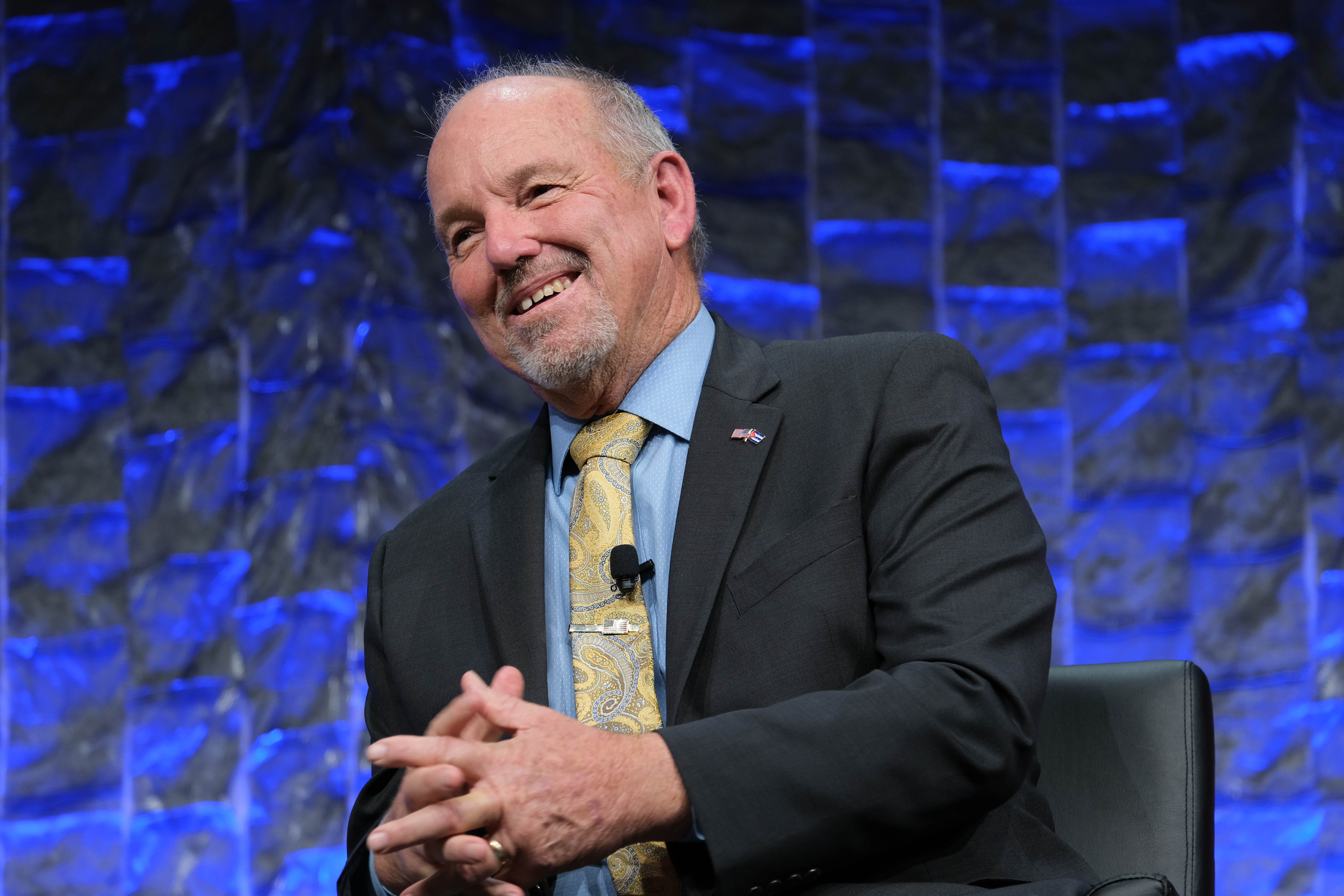
Hewitt speaking on a panel at FreedomFest 2021 in Rapid City, South Dakota, during his gubernatorial campaign

Hewitt sought election to the California State Senate in 2014 and the California State Assembly in 2016.

On April 2, 2016, Hewitt was elected the Region 4 representative to the Libertarian National Committee, succeeding Daniel Wiener. He was re-elected in 2018 and 2020. Hewitt announced his candidacy in the 2021 California gubernatorial recall election in an op-ed in the Orange County Register on May 2, 2021. The 50% threshold to recall incumbent Democrat Gavin Newsom was not reached. Hewitt received 0.7% of the replacement candidate vote.

== Electoral history ==
2010 Calimesa City Council election
Candidate	Votes	%
Jim Hyatt	1,560	38.4
Jeff Hewitt	1,007	24.8
John Keith	882	21.7
Arthur Guerrero	614	15.1
Total votes	4,063	100%

2014 California State Senate special election, District 23
Primary election
Party	Candidate	Votes	%
Republican	Mike Morrell	43,447	62.6
Democratic	Ronald O'Donnell	10,531	15.2
Democratic	Ameenah Fuller	6,705	9.7
Libertarian	Jeff Hewitt	4,479	6.5
Republican	Crystal Ruiz	4,187	6.0
Total votes		69,349	100%

2016 California State Assembly election, District 42
Primary election
Party	Candidate	Votes	%
Republican	Chad Mayes (incumbent)	49,580	50.8
Democratic	Greg Rodriguez	40,446	41.4
Libertarian	Jeff Hewitt	7,601	7.8
Total votes		97,627	100%

2018 Riverside County Board of Supervisors election, District 5
Primary election
Candidate	Votes	%
Russ Bogh	14,698	26.6
Jeff Hewitt	14,304	25.9
Jaime Hurtado	11,409	20.7
Patricia Vargas Sanchez	8,388	15.2
Altie Holcomb	6,402	11.6
Total votes	55,201	100%
General election
Jeff Hewitt	54,891	51.9
Russ Bogh	50,878	48.1
Total votes	105,769	100%

2021 California gubernatorial recall election (replacement candidates)
Party	Candidate	Votes	%
Republican	Larry Elder	3,563,867	48.4%
Democratic	Kevin Paffrath	706,778	9.6%
Republican	Kevin Faulconer	590,346	8.0%
Democratic	Brandon M. Ross	392,029	5.3%
Republican	John Cox	305,095	4.1%
Republican	Kevin Kiley	255,490	3.5%
Democratic	Jacqueline McGowan	214,242	2.9%
Democratic	Joel Ventresca	186,345	2.5%
Democratic	Daniel Watts	167,355	2.3%
Democratic	Holly L. Baade	92,218	1.3%
Democratic	Patrick Kilpatrick	86,617	1.2%
Democratic	Armando "Mando" Perez-Serrato	85,061	1.2%
Republican	Caitlyn Jenner	75,215	1.0%
Democratic	John R. Drake	68,545	0.9%
Green	Dan Kapelovitz	64,375	0.9%
Libertarian	Jeff Hewitt	50,378	0.7%
Republican	Ted Gaines	47,937	0.7%
No party preference	Angelyne	35,900	0.5%
No party preference	David Moore	31,224	nil
Republican	Anthony Trimino	28,101	nil
Republican	Doug Ose	26,204	nil
No party preference	Michael Loebs	25,468	nil
Green	Heather Collins	24,260	nil
No party preference	Major Singh	21,394	nil
Republican	David Lozano	19,945	nil
Republican	Denver Stoner	19,588	nil
Republican	Sam Gallucci	18,134	nil
Republican	Steve Chavez Lodge	17,435	nil
Republican	Jenny Rae Le Roux	16,032	nil
Republican	David Alexander Bramante	11,501	nil
Republican	Diego Martinez	10,860	nil
Republican	Robert C. Newman II	10,602	nil
Republican	Sarah Stephens	10,583	nil
No party preference	Dennis Richter	10,468	nil
Republican	Major Williams (write-in)	8,965	nil
No party preference	Denis Lucey	8,182	nil
No party preference	James G. Hanink	7,193	nil
Republican	Daniel Mercuri	7,110	nil
Republican	Chauncey "Slim" Killens	6,879	nil
Republican	Leo S. Zacky	6,099	nil
No party preference	Kevin Kaul	5,600	nil
Republican	David Hillberg	4,435	nil
No party preference	Adam Papagan	4,021	nil
Republican	Rhonda Furin	3,964	nil
Republican	Nickolas Wildstar	3,811	nil
No party preference	Jeremiah "Jeremy" Marciniak	2,894	nil
Republican	Joe M. Symmon	2,397	nil
No party preference	Miki Habryn (write-in)	137	nil
Democratic	Roxanne (write-in)	116	nil
Democratic	Stacy Smith (write-in)	81	nil
No party preference	Vivek B. Mohan (write-in)	68	nil
American Independent	Thuy E. Hugens (write-in)	19	nil
No party preference	Vince Lundgren (write-in)	5	nil
Total valid votes		7,361,568	100
Turnout		12,892,578	58.5%
Registered electors		22,057,154	

2022 Riverside County Board of Supervisors election, District 5
Primary election
Candidate	Votes	%
Yxstian Gutierrez	19,337	33.6
Jeff Hewitt	18,292	31.8
Lloyd White	15,066	26.2
Deni Antionette Mazingo	4,908	8.5
Total votes	57,603	100%
General election
Yxstian Gutierrez	47,312	54.3
Jeff Hewitt	39,887	45.7
Total votes	87,199	100%

== Personal life ==
Hewitt was born in 1953 in Redlands, California. He is married to his third wife Wendy, who is the secretary of the Riverside County Libertarian Party. She has served on the Calimesa City Council since 2020. Hewitt has six children.

Party political offices
Preceded by Daniel Wiener	Member of the Libertarian National Committee from the 4th region 2016–2022	Succeeded by Carrie Eiler
Political offices
Preceded by Joyce McIntire	Mayor of Calimesa; 2015–2018	Succeeded by Bill Davis
Preceded by Marion Ashley	Member of the Riverside County; Board of Supervisors from the 5th district 2019-2023	Succeeded by Yxstian Gutierrez
Preceded by Karen Spiegel	Vice Chair of the Riverside County; Board of Supervisors; 2021–2022; Served under: Karen Spiegel	Succeeded by Kevin Jeffries
Preceded by Karen Spiegel	Chair of the Riverside County; Board of Supervisors; 2022–2023	Succeeded by Kevin Jeffries
