= Brian Goggin =

Brian Goggin may refer to:

- Brian Goggin (banker)
- Brian Goggin (artist)
