= Terry Goggin =

Californian businessman and politician

Terrence Goggin

Member of the California State Assembly from the 66th district
- In office December 2, 1974 - November 30, 1984
- Preceded by: Joe Gonsalves
- Succeeded by: Gerald R. Eaves

Personal details
- Born: November 8, 1941 (age 84) Glendale, California
- Party: Democratic
- Spouse: Jill Tronvig (m. 1963)
- Children: 3; including Brian Goggin
- Education: University of Southern California
- Occupation: Attorney

Military service
- Branch/service: United States Army

Terrence (Terry) Goggin (born November 8, 1941) is an American author, businessman, educator, and politician in the state of California. He was born in Los Angeles CA in 1941 to George T. Goggin, a successful Hollywood lawyer. and Mary Adelaide Hare, a writer and homemaker and personal assistant to California oil baron Edward L. Doheny. He served in the California State Assembly as a Democrat from 1974 to 1985. After leaving State government he attended to his business interests and the practice of law. After he was accused of defrauding investors in a chain of coffee shops, Goggin pleaded guilty to one count of money laundering in December 2019, and was sentenced to one year and one day in prison in February 2021.

== Early life and education ==
Goggin lived with his family in Glendale, California from 1941 to 1955. He attended Incarnation Catholic School in Glendale California. Thereafter, he attended Villanova Preparatory School in Ojai California. In 1959 Goggin left Glendale for Georgetown University, College of Arts and Sciences where he was elected president of the 160-year-old Philodemic Debating Society, with a seat on the Student Council. He was also a Cadet Captain in the school's ROTC.

In 1963, he was admitted to The University of Southern California, Gould School of Law. While there he was accepted into the Southern California Law Review and published two separate articles on the difficulty of obtaining a fair trial in the midst of massive negative publicity. In 1965 and 1966, while finishing law school, Goggin conducted legal research in the California Attorney General's Office in the Consumer Fraud and Anti Trust Division.

== Career ==
=== Military service ===
After graduating from Georgetown he was commissioned as a second lieutenant in the United States Army. He trained at the Infantry Officer School and the Airborne School at Fort Benning Georgia. Upon completing training, he joined the faculty at the US Military Academy at West Point, New York, as an instructor and debate coach. From 1967 through 1970 he taught history and government. He also developed a seminar in public policy. The seminar focused on race, environment, and central cities, one of the first courses in the country to offer classes in current economic and social problems using a case method approach. Based on the seminar, along with Mick Seidel, his co-author, he published Politics American Style: Race, Environment, and Central Cities (Prentice-Hall, 1972). In his last year, he was appointed an assistant professor.

While at West Point, in the summer of 1969, he was assigned to the White House as a special consultant to the White House Urban Affairs Council. He, along with another colleague from West Point, conducted a field study on the political use of the food stamp and donated food programs in Mississippi, Missouri, California and New York which formed the basis for a memorandum to the president on the misuse of the food assistance programs.

After that, he left the military, returned to California, and began the practice of law with his father in the law firm of Goggin, Goggin, and Commons in Los Angeles California.

=== Public life ===
Goggin ran for Congress in 1972 in the newly created 38th Congressional District. He lost the primary to George Brown,(D. Colton) who then offered him his top staff position as Administrative Assistant (now termed Chief of Staff) where he represented the Congressman, as his Attorney, in the fight to block the Federal Trade Commission from granting Natural Gas Companies a 73% rate hike. In 1974, Goggin won election to the California Assembly with 72% of the vote.

In his first term, he became a lead co-author of the Nuclear Energy Laws banning new nuclear power plants until the safety of both the plants and the recycling and storage of plutonium fuel could be resolved. These laws were later challenged by the California utilities, who claimed that they were by Federal Law and therefore unconstitutional. In 1982 the US Supreme Court upheld their constitutionality.

In 1976 he was appointed chairman of the Assembly Subcommittee on Energy and investigated the question of whether and where to site Liquefied Natural Gas (LNG) plants. After concluding a three-month investigation in Goggin's subcommittee, the legislature passed a bill, LNG Terminal Act of 1977 (S.B.1081), restricting LNG facilities to nonpopulated areas. Because of pricing issues, they also mandated that ratepayer funds could not be used until the price of LNG became competitive with other energy options and certified as such by the PUC. Such certification had not occurred in the 40 years since the passage of this legislation.

In 1977, Coggin was invited to teach in the Fall Term, at Harvard University as a Kennedy Fellow at the Kennedy Institute of Politics. He led a Seminar on the "Politics of Nuclear Power" and how peaceful protests and lobbying can be effective in defeating entrenched corporate power.

In 1978 He was appointed chairman of the Ways and Means Resources Subcommittee overseeing the then $3 Billion Dollar Budget for the Transportation and a Resources Agencies including the State Parks Department. While he was Chairman the subcommittee forced the State Parks Department to refocus on much needed urban parks and funded the most expensive park acquisition up to that time: $30 million for 5 miles of coastal plain and cliffs restored to their original flora and fauna. The Chrystal Cove State Park, just north of Laguna Beach in urban Orange County, preserved from high rise development forever a unique part of the urban southern coast.

In 1981, after a bitter and divisive Speakership fight, the new Speaker Willie Brown appointed him Chairman of the Criminal Justice Committee.

As Chairman he worked with the Mothers Against Drunk Drivers to create the first DUI bill that required jail time for repeat drunk drivers and long term suspended licenses. Due to reports of mentally disordered sex offenders and not guilty by reason of insanity offenders escaping from state mental hospitals at which they were confined and creating havoc in the neighboring communities, at Chairman Goggin's urging, the legislature unanimously passed the legislation mandating that the California Department of Corrections take over security control of these state hospitals from the State Department of Mental Health. This action was vehemently opposed by the police unions who represented the fired state hospital security guards.

In 1984, due in part, to the strong and often harsh opposition of the energy companies and the police unions for his legislation, Goggin was defeated in an extremely close race in the Democratic primary in 1984.

=== Real Estate Development ===
From 1986 to 1989, Goggin was a successful subdivision developer in southern California. Among his developments were Deerfield Homes, Bellflower California (33 homes) and Cottrell Ranch, La Puente California (78 homes)

In December 1980, Goggin was part of an investment group that formed the White Pine Company and planned to purchase the Hotel Nevada and Gambling Hall in Ely, Nevada. A 30 percent interest in the company would be held by the White Pine Trust, a fund that would be established by Goggin, with his wife Jill and three children as the beneficiaries, while another member of the company would act as the trustee of Goggin's trust. Plans to purchase the Hotel Nevada were delayed by the Nevada Gaming Control Board, which had concerns about Goggin's trust fund. Because of the trust, Goggin would seemingly not benefit directly from the hotel. However, Control Board members requested that Goggin still participate in a suitability hearing. One Board member said that Goggin's trust seemed like an attempt to "cover something up." Goggin denied that he was using the trust fund to obscure his investment in the Hotel Nevada. The sale was ultimately approved by the Control Board and the Nevada Gaming Commission later that month.

=== Coffee Business and Criminal Charges ===
In November 2018, a federal grand jury in Oakland, California indicted Goggin for allegedly defrauding investors in a chain of Peet's Coffee stands inside BART stations and using the funds for personal expenses. He was charged with four counts of wire fraud and nine counts of money-laundering. Goggin pleaded guilty to one count of money laundering in December 2019, admitting that he had "falsely told investors that their money would go toward the Peet's Coffee projects but specifically planned to use the funds for other purposes." He was sentenced to one year and one day in prison and ordered to pay $685,000 in restitution for his victims by Judge James Donato of the United States District Court for the Northern District of California.

== Personal life ==
In 1963 Goggin married Jill Anne Tronvig, a graduate of Scripps College Claremont and a teacher who was born in Los Angeles California. The marriage lasted from 1963 to 1984. The Goggin's together had three sons, including artist Brian Goggin.
