= Hugo Hotel =

Former hotel in San Francisco, California

Coordinates: 37.7795°N 122.40717°W

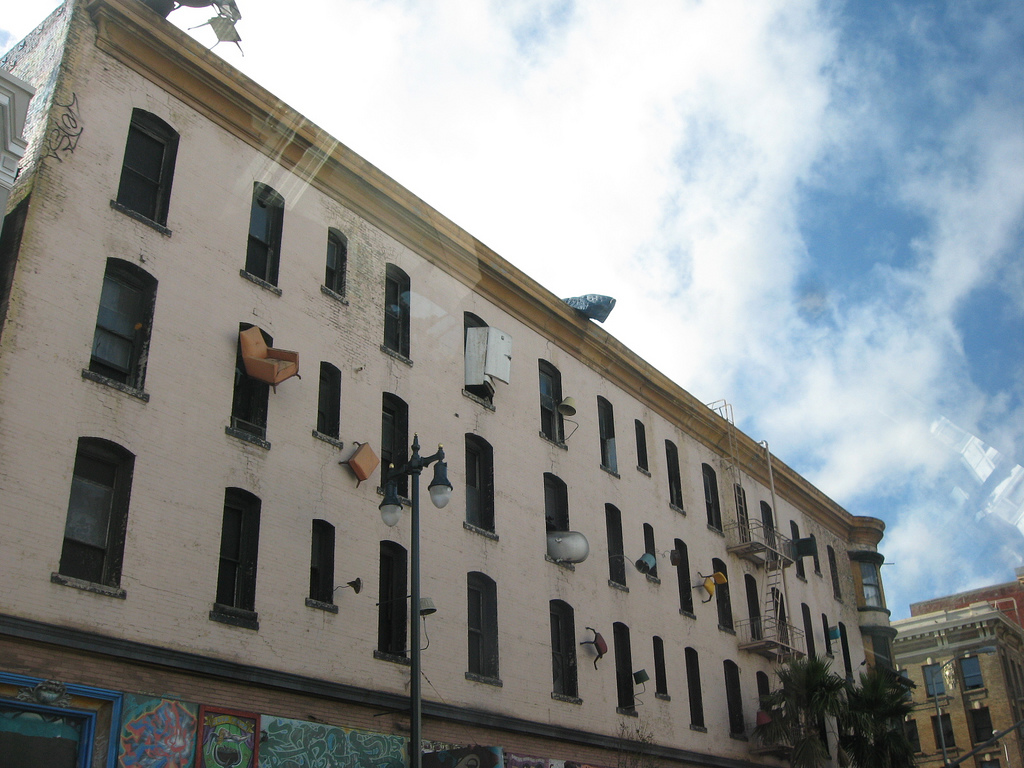
Hugo Hotel

The Hugo Hotel was a building in San Francisco's South of Market district built in 1909, designed by Theo W. Lenzen. It was located at 200-214 Sixth Street.

Gutted by fire in 1988, Hugo Hotel was notable for being held vacant by the owner for 26 years, and for being the site of the Defenestration of Furniture art installation created in 1997 by local artist Brian Goggin.

The San Francisco Redevelopment Agency took the owners to court in 2008. In 2009, the building was acquired by the City and County of San Francisco under a rare claim of eminent domain for $4.6 million.

It was finally razed in 2015 to make way for affordable housing; in 2017 the Bill Sorro Community, an apartment house for low-income residents, was completed at the site.
