= California's 66th State Assembly district =

American legislative district

Current assemblymember
Al Muratsuchi; D–Rolling Hills Estates
- Population (2010) • Voting age • Citizen voting age: 467,745; 365,069; 303,141
- Demographics: 46.33% White; 4.84% Black; 21.02% Latino; 25.73% Asian; 0.43% Native American; 0.52% Hawaiian/Pacific Islander; 0.39% other; 0.74% remainder of multiracial
- Registered voters: 306,235
- Registration: 42.72% Democratic; 27.24% Republican; 24.74% No party preference

California's 66th State Assembly district is one of 80 California State Assembly districts. It is currently represented by Democrat Al Muratsuchi of Rolling Hills Estates.

== District profile ==
The district encompasses the heart of the South Bay region, including the Beach Cities and the Palos Verdes Peninsula. Located southwest of Downtown Los Angeles, the district is relatively suburban and primarily affluent.

Los Angeles County – 4.8%

- Alondra Park
- Gardena – 74.2%
- Hermosa Beach
- Lomita
- Los Angeles – 1.0%
  - Harbor City – partial
  - Harbor Gateway – partial
- Manhattan Beach
- Palos Verdes Estates
- Rancho Palos Verdes
- Redondo Beach
- Rolling Hills
- Rolling Hills Estates
- Torrance
- West Carson

== Election results from statewide races ==
Year	Office	Results
2020	President	Biden 63.2 – 34.4%
2018	Governor	Newsom 59.3 – 40.7%
2018	Senator	Feinstein 59.8 – 40.2%
2016	President	Clinton 60.0 – 33.6%
2016	Senator	Harris 63.8 – 36.2%
2014	Governor	Brown 52.3 – 47.7%
2012	President	Obama 54.2 – 43.2%
2012	Senator	Feinstein 57.1 – 42.9%

== List of assembly members representing the district ==
Due to redistricting, the 66th district has been moved around different parts of the state. The current iteration resulted from the 2021 redistricting by the California Citizens Redistricting Commission.

Assembly members	Party	Years served	Counties represented	Notes
Elihu B. Beard	Democratic	January 5, 1885 – January 3, 1887	Stanisluas	
C. C. Wright	Democratic	January 3, 1887 – January 7, 1889	Stanisluas	
Vital E. Bangs	Democratic	January 7, 1889 – January 5, 1891	Stanisluas	
John S. Alexander	Republican	January 5, 1891 – January 2, 1893	Stanisluas	
Edward A. Pueschel	Democratic	January 2, 1893 – January 7, 1895	Kern	
R. C. Dale	Republican	January 7, 1895 – January 4, 1897	Kern	
E. J. Emmons	Fusion	January 4, 1897 – January 2, 1899	Kern	
R. C. Dale	Republican	January 2, 1899 – January 1, 1901	Kern	
J. W. P. Laird	Democratic	January 1, 1901 – January 5, 1903	Kern	
Jess R. Dorsey	Republican	January 5, 1903 – January 7, 1907	Kern	
Harry W. McMullin	Republican	January 7, 1907 – January 4, 1909	Kern	
Rowen Irwin	Democratic	January 4, 1909 – January 2, 1911	Kern	
Fred H. Hall	Democratic	January 2, 1911 – January 6, 1913	Kern	
Thomas Lyford Ambrose	Republican	January 6, 1913 – January 4, 1915	Los Angeles	
Richmond Pitts Benton	Republican	January 4, 1915 – January 8, 1917	Los Angeles	
Thomas Lyford Ambrose	Republican	January 8, 1917 – January 3, 1921	Los Angeles	
Richmond Pitts Benton	Republican	January 3, 1921 – January 8, 1923	Los Angeles	
Otto J. Emme	Republican	January 8, 1923 – January 5, 1925	Los Angeles	
William Matthew Byrne Sr.	Republican	January 5, 1925 – January 5, 1931	Los Angeles	
James E. Stockwell	Republican	January 5, 1931 – January 2, 1933	Los Angeles	
James J. Boyle	Democratic	January 2, 1933 – January 2, 1939	Los Angeles	
Jack Massion	Democratic	January 2, 1939 – January 6, 1947	Los Angeles	
Gordon Hahn	Republican	January 6, 1947 – June 15, 1953	Los Angeles	Resigned to become a Member of the Los Angeles City Council.
Vacant		June 15, 1953 – December 2, 1953	Los Angeles	
Kenneth A. Ross Jr.	Republican	December 2, 1953 – January 3, 1955	Los Angeles	Sworn in after winning special election.
Charles H. Wilson	Democratic	January 3, 1955 – January 3, 1963	Los Angeles	Got elected to the 31st congressional district.
Joe Gonsalves	Democratic	January 7, 1963 – November 30, 1974	Los Angeles	
Terry Goggin	Democratic	December 2, 1974 – November 30, 1984	San Bernardino	
Gerald R. Eaves	Democratic	December 3, 1984 – November 30, 1992	San Bernardino	
Ray Haynes	Republican	December 7, 1992 – November 30, 1994	Riverside, San Diego	
Bruce Thompson	Republican	December 5, 1994 – November 30, 2000	Riverside, San Diego	
Dennis Hollingsworth	Republican	December 4, 2000 – November 30, 2002	Riverside, San Diego	
Ray Haynes	Republican	December 2, 2002 – November 30, 2006	Riverside, San Diego	
Kevin Jeffries	Republican	December 4, 2006 – November 30, 2012	Riverside, San Diego	
Al Muratsuchi	Democratic	December 3, 2012 – November 30, 2014	Los Angeles	
David Hadley	Republican	December 1, 2014 – November 30, 2016	Los Angeles	
Al Muratsuchi	Democratic	December 5, 2016 – present	Los Angeles	

== Election results (1990–present) ==
=== 2024 ===
2024 California State Assembly 66th district election
Primary election
Party	Candidate	Votes	%
Democratic	Al Muratsuchi (incumbent)	67,838	59.1
Republican	George Barks	46,910	40.9
Total votes		114,748	100.0
General election
Democratic	Al Muratsuchi (incumbent)	131,680	60.2
Republican	George Barks	86,986	39.8
Total votes		218,666	100.0
Democratic hold			

=== 2022 ===
2022 California State Assembly 66th district election
Primary election
Party	Candidate	Votes	%
Democratic	Al Muratsuchi (incumbent)	67,618	61.7
Republican	George Barks	41,918	38.3
Total votes		109,536	100.0
General election
Democratic	Al Muratsuchi (incumbent)	99,280	59.9
Republican	George Barks	66,332	40.1
Total votes		165,612	100.0
Democratic hold			

=== 2020 ===
2020 California State Assembly 66th district election
Primary election
Party	Candidate	Votes	%
Democratic	Al Muratsuchi (incumbent)	83,172	66.2
Republican	Arthur C. Schaper	42,536	33.8
Total votes		125,708	100.0
General election
Democratic	Al Muratsuchi (incumbent)	145,874	63.2
Republican	Arthur C. Schaper	84,867	35.8
Total votes		230,741	100.0
Democratic hold			

=== 2018 ===
2018 California State Assembly 66th district election
Primary election
Party	Candidate	Votes	%
Democratic	Al Muratsuchi (incumbent)	47,976	50.9
Republican	Frank A. Scotto	40,727	43.2
Democratic	Caney Arnold	5,612	6.0
Total votes		88,703	100.0
General election
Democratic	Al Muratsuchi (incumbent)	108,627	60.5
Republican	Frank A. Scotto	71,057	39.5
Total votes		179,684	100.0
Democratic hold			

=== 2016 ===
2016 California State Assembly 66th district election
Primary election
Party	Candidate	Votes	%
Democratic	Al Muratsuchi	53,295	48.7
Republican	David Hadley (incumbent)	48,755	44.6
Democratic	Mike Madrigal	7,307	6.7
Total votes		109,357	100.0
General election
Democratic	Al Muratsuchi	105,336	54.1
Republican	David Hadley (incumbent)	89,308	45.9
Total votes		194,644	100.0
Democratic gain from Republican			

=== 2014 ===
2014 California State Assembly 66th district election
Primary election
Party	Candidate	Votes	%
Republican	David Hadley	30,996	50.5
Democratic	Al Muratsuchi (incumbent)	30,439	49.5
Total votes		61,435	100.0
General election
Republican	David Hadley	54,401	50.3
Democratic	Al Muratsuchi (incumbent)	53,695	49.7
Total votes		108,096	100.0
Republican gain from Democratic			

=== 2012 ===
2012 California State Assembly 66th district election
Primary election
Party	Candidate	Votes	%
Democratic	Al Muratsuchi	27,360	40.5
Republican	Craig Huey	26,298	38.9
Republican	Nathan Mintz	13,914	20.6
Total votes		67,572	100.0
General election
Democratic	Al Muratsuchi	102,136	54.8
Republican	Craig Huey	84,372	45.2
Total votes		186,508	100.0
Democratic gain from Republican			

=== 2010 ===
2010 California State Assembly 66th district election
Party	Candidate	Votes	%
Republican	Kevin Jeffries (incumbent)	81,176	64.8
Democratic	Douglas P. Dye	44,134	35.2
Total votes		125,310	100.0
Republican hold			

=== 2008 ===
2008 California State Assembly 66th district election
Party	Candidate	Votes	%
Republican	Kevin Jeffries (incumbent)	95,093	57.9
Democratic	Grey Frandsen	69,040	42.1
Total votes		164,133	100.0
Republican hold			

=== 2006 ===
2006 California State Assembly 66th district election
Party	Candidate	Votes	%
Republican	Kevin Jeffries	62,582	61.6
Democratic	Laurel Nicholson	39,081	38.4
Total votes		101,663	100.0
Republican hold			

=== 2004 ===
2004 California State Assembly 66th district election
Party	Candidate	Votes	%
Republican	Ray Haynes (incumbent)	91,606	61.6
Democratic	Laurel Nicholson	53,481	36.0
Libertarian	Jack N. Lee	3,671	2.5
Total votes		148,758	100.0
Republican hold			

=== 2002 ===
2002 California State Assembly 66th district election
Party	Candidate	Votes	%
Republican	Ray Haynes	55,205	68.1
Democratic	David G. Brostrom	25,930	31.9
Total votes		81,135	100.0
Republican hold			

=== 2000 ===
2000 California State Assembly 66th district election
Party	Candidate	Votes	%
Republican	Dennis Hollingsworth	112,328	64.0
Democratic	Bob Canfield	55,239	31.5
Green	Chuck Reutter	8,045	4.6
Total votes		175,612	100.0
Republican hold			

=== 1998 ===
1998 California State Assembly 66th district election
Party	Candidate	Votes	%
Republican	Bruce Thompson (incumbent)	78,961	61.7
Democratic	Patsy Hockersmith	48,949	38.3
Total votes		127,910	100.0
Republican hold			

=== 1996 ===
1996 California State Assembly 66th district election
Party	Candidate	Votes	%
Republican	Bruce Thompson (incumbent)	91,676	62.1
Democratic	Patty Hockersmith	50,594	34.3
Libertarian	Bill Reed	5,298	3.6
Total votes		147,568	100.0
Republican hold			

=== 1994 ===
1994 California State Assembly 66th district election
Party	Candidate	Votes	%
Republican	Bruce Thompson	79,814	67.4
Democratic	David Hendrick	34,017	28.7
Peace and Freedom	Erin Wood	4,666	3.9
Total votes		118,497	100.0
Republican hold			

=== 1992 ===
1992 California State Assembly 66th district election
Party	Candidate	Votes	%
Republican	Ray Haynes	83,919	58.1
Democratic	Patsy Hockersmith	45,324	31.4
Peace and Freedom	Anne Patrice Wood	10,303	7.1
Libertarian	Bill E. Reed	4,916	3.4
Total votes		144,462	100.0
Republican gain from Democratic			

=== 1990 ===
1990 California State Assembly 66th district election
Party	Candidate	Votes	%
Democratic	Gerald R. Eaves (incumbent)	44,944	59.3
Republican	Steven W. Hall	30,824	40.7
Total votes		75,768	100.0
Democratic hold			

== See also ==
- California State Assembly
- California State Assembly districts
- Districts in California
