= Ray Haynes =

American politician

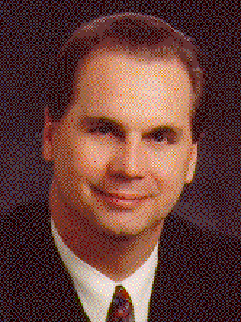

Member of the California State Assembly from the 66th district
- In office December 2, 2002 – November 30, 2006
- Preceded by: Dennis Hollingsworth
- Succeeded by: Kevin Jeffries
- In office December 7, 1992 – November 30, 1994
- Preceded by: Gerald R. Eaves
- Succeeded by: Bruce Thompson

Member of the California Senate from the 36th district
- In office December 5, 1994 – November 30, 2002
- Preceded by: Robert B. Presley
- Succeeded by: Dennis Hollingsworth

Personal details
- Born: August 26, 1954 (age 72) Merced, California
- Party: Republican
- Spouse: Amparo Haynes
- Children: 3
- Education: California Lutheran College (BA); University of Southern California (JD); Eastern Kentucky University (MPA)

Raymond Neal Haynes Jr. (born August 26, 1954) is an American politician and member of the Republican Party from the state of California.

== Early and personal life ==
Born in Merced, California, Haynes graduated from University of Southern California Law School. Prior to his service in the Legislature, Senator Haynes community activities included service on the board of the Riverside Youth Service Center, an organization dedicated to helping the troubled youth of the City of Riverside, the board of the Riverside County American Red Cross, and Chair of the Moreno Valley Community Assistance Program, which provided food and clothing to those in need in the City of Moreno Valley in Riverside County. He also served on the Planning Commission of the City of Moreno Valley. He received his Bachelor of Arts in Political Science from California Lutheran College in 1976, his Master's in Public Administration from Eastern Kentucky in 1981, and his Juris Doctor from the University of Southern California in 1980. Senator Haynes was admitted to the practice of law in California in 1980. He moved to Moreno Valley and practiced law in Riverside, starting a solo law practice in 1988.

Haynes' has three daughters: Jennifer Salwender and Caitlin and Sarah Haynes, and two grandchildren, Joshua and Annika Salwender. He is currently married to Maria Amparo Villamor-Haynes, a Filipino lawyer.

== Political career ==
Haynes was first elected to the California State Assembly in 1992, serving in that body from 1992 to 1994. Haynes was then elected to the California State Senate, serving in that body from 1994 to 2002 and serving as Senate Republican Whip from 1996 to 2002. During the 1994 United States House of Representatives elections, Haynes outed candidate Mark Takano, calling him a "homosexual liberal;" Takano ultimately lost the election to Ken Calvert. In 2000 he served as National Chairman of the American Legislative Exchange Council (ALEC), a conservative group that produces proposed model legislation. He ran for the U.S. Senate in 2000, losing in the Republican primary to then-U.S. Representative Tom Campbell. Haynes was again elected to the Assembly in 2002, representing District 66, which includes western Riverside and northern San Diego counties. Haynes was also the Assistant Republican Leader in the Assembly from 2003 to 2006. Haynes left the Legislature as a result of California’s term limits law in 2006, and opened a private law and government relations practice with an emphasis in environmental issues. In 2006, he was Chairman of California Border Police Initiative.

In the Senate, Haynes was Chairman of the Senate Constitutional Amendments Committee (one of the two Republicans to serve as chair of the over 20 committees in the Senate), Vice Chair of the Senate Health and Human Services Committee, Vice Chair of the Senate Education Committee, Vice Chair of the Senate Public Employees and Retirement Committee, Vice Chair of the Assembly Human Services Committee, and he served on the Senate Budget and Judiciary Committees, as well as the Assembly Budget, Appropriations, Judiciary and Health Committees.

Haynes ran for the State Board of Equalization in 2006, losing to Michelle Steel in the Republican primary. He ran for California's 36th congressional district in the 2014 elections to the United States House of Representatives but was not elected.

Haynes supports and has advanced a conservative case for the National Popular Vote Interstate Compact.

Political offices
Preceded by Jerry Eaves	California State Assemblyman, 66th District; 1992-1994	Succeeded by Bruce Thompson
Preceded by Robert B. Presley	California State Senator, 36th District; 1994-2002	Succeeded by Dennis Hollingsworth
Preceded by Dennis Hollingsworth	California State Assemblyman, 66th District; 2002-2006	Succeeded by Kevin Jeffries
