= Al Muratsuchi =

American politician

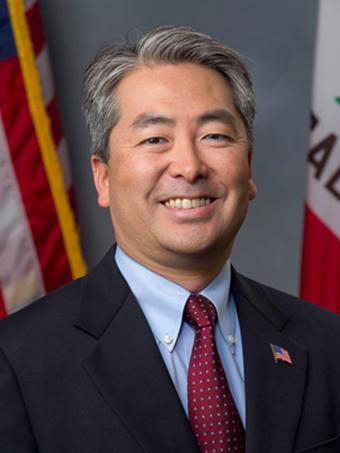
- Official portrait, 2012

Member of the California State Assembly from the 66th district
- Incumbent
- Assumed office December 5, 2016
- Preceded by: David Hadley
- In office December 3, 2012 – November 30, 2014
- Preceded by: Kevin Jeffries
- Succeeded by: David Hadley

Personal details
- Born: September 4, 1966 (age 60) Okinawa Prefecture, Japan
- Party: Democratic
- Spouse: Hiroko Higuchi
- Children: 1
- Education: University of California, Berkeley (BA); University of California, Los Angeles (JD)
- Profession: Attorney; Prosecutor
- Website: www.alforcaliforniaschools.com

Albert Yasuro Muratsuchi (born September 4, 1964) is a Japanese-American attorney serving the California State Assembly. A Democrat, he represents the 66th Assembly district, encompassing parts of the South Bay region of Los Angeles, including the cities of Torrance, Manhattan Beach, and Redondo Beach.

Prior to his service in the State Assembly, he was a deputy California Attorney General, trustee for the Torrance Unified School District, and trustee for the Southern California Regional Occupation Center.

First elected to the Assembly in 2012 to represent the 66th State Assembly district, Muratsuchi was narrowly defeated during the 2014 Republican wave. He won back the seat in 2016 rematch and has held the seat since.

== Personal life ==
Muratsuchi was born on September 4, 1964, and grew up on U.S. military bases in Okinawa, Japan. His father, a 2nd-generation Japanese American, was a civilian employee of the United States Army. His mother was born in Gifu Prefecture in Honshu, Japan.

Due to his father's job, he was largely raised on various military bases overseas. He attended the University of California, Berkeley and UCLA School of Law.

== Career ==
Muratsuchi was a prosecutor in the California Department of Justice and served as a Deputy Attorney General. He also served as the regional director of the Japanese American Citizens League Pacific Southwest District.

== Political career ==
=== Legislative committee assignments ===
Chairman of the Joint Legislative Committee on Climate Change Policies, Chairman of the Assembly Budget Subcommittee on Education Finance, and Chairman of the Assembly Select Committee on Aerospace. Member of: Assembly Committee on Natural Resources, Assembly Judiciary Committee, Assembly Budget Committee, and Veterans Affairs.

Appointments to Board and Commission: California Coastal Conservancy, Santa Monica Bay Restoration Commission, Governor Brown's Military Council, Inter-agency Veterans Council.

==== Environment ====
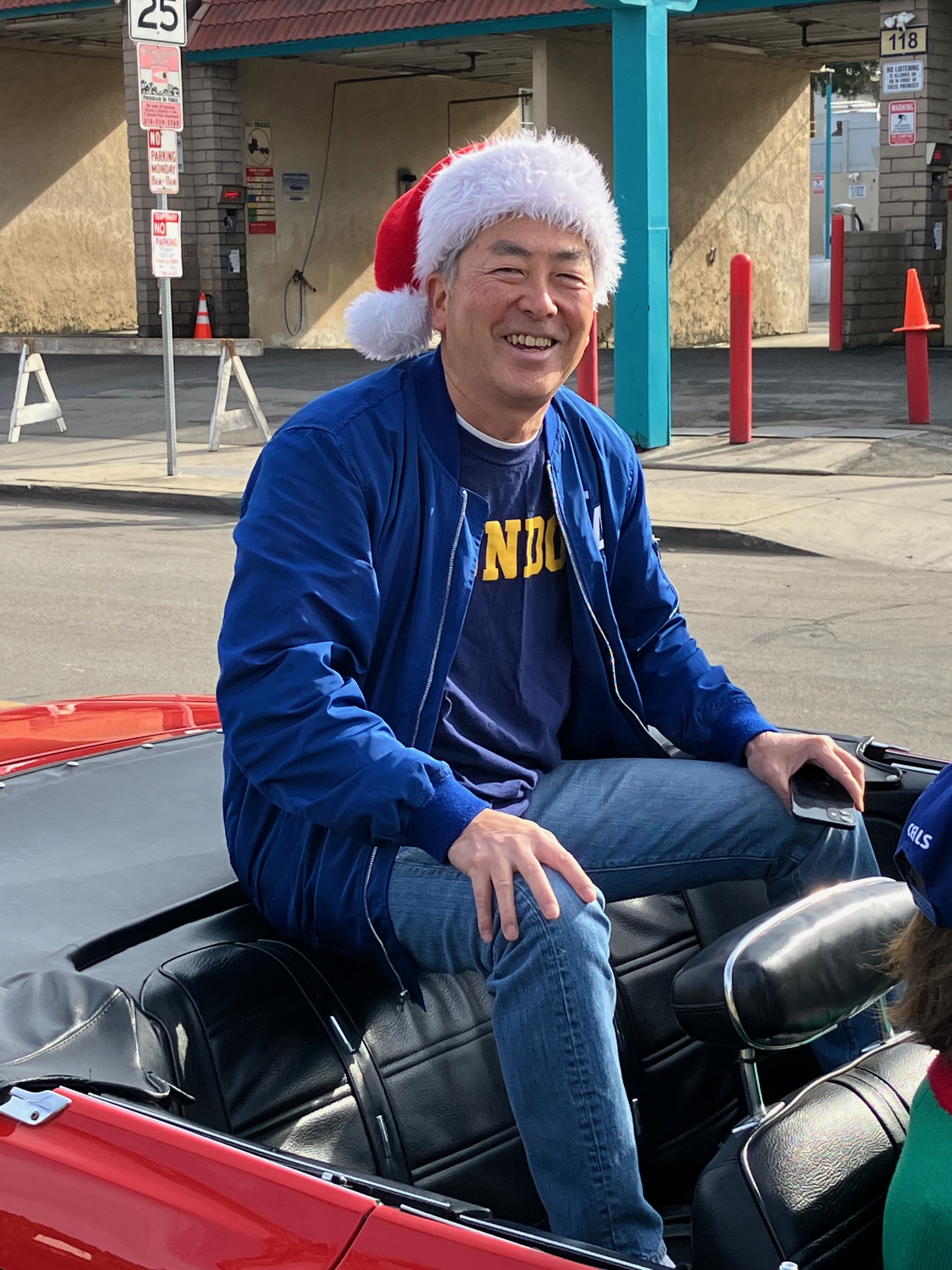
Al Muratsuchi, in the 2024 El Segundo Christmas Parade

In 2020, Muratsuchi introduced AB-345, which would have required a minimum setback distance of 2,500 feet between oil wells and public areas where children are present and public notices of potential consequences to local communities.

He has said that there was strong opposition from oil and gas industry trade unions, whom the Los Angeles Times has noted are major supporters of Democratic candidates. The bill failed in the Senate Natural Resources and Water Committee in a 5–4 decision. State Senator Robert Hertzberg, who made the pivotal vote, said that he opposed the bill because Governor Gavin Newsom has already signed a bill in 2019 with similar intentions of setting up buffer zones. However, Muratsuchi has noted that Newsom has not made a definite commitment to do so.

=== Elections ===
First elected to the Assembly in 2012 to represent the 66th Assembly District, Muratsuchi was narrowly defeated by Republican David Hadley during the 2014 Republican wave in an upset. In a 2016 rematch with Hadley, he reclaimed his old Assembly seat. Since then, Muratsuchi has retained the seat with comfortable electoral margins.

He was easily reelected over former Torrance Mayor Frank A. Scotto in 2018. In 2020, he was reelected by a wide margin over Arthur C. Schaper, whom the Southern Poverty Law Center called a "longtime anti-immigrant and nativist activist."

In 2022, he was reelected over former Hermosa Beach Mayor George Barks winning 59.9% to 40.1%.

Term limits prevented Muratsuchi from running for reelection to the legislature in 2026. He unsuccessfully ran for Superintendent of Public Instruction, receiving 8% of the vote and failing to advance to the top-two runoff.

== Electoral history ==
2012 California State Assembly 66th district election
Primary election
Party	Candidate	Votes	%
Democratic	Al Muratsuchi	27,360	40.5
Republican	Craig Huey	26,298	38.9
Republican	Nathan Mintz	13,914	20.6
Total votes		67,572	100.0
General election
Democratic	Al Muratsuchi	102,136	54.8
Republican	Craig Huey	84,372	45.2
Total votes		186,508	100.0
Democratic gain from Republican			

2014 California State Assembly 66th district election
Primary election
Party	Candidate	Votes	%
Republican	David Hadley	30,996	50.5
Democratic	Al Muratsuchi (incumbent)	30,439	49.5
Total votes		61,435	100.0
General election
Republican	David Hadley	54,401	50.3
Democratic	Al Muratsuchi (incumbent)	53,695	49.7
Total votes		108,096	100.0
Republican gain from Democratic			

2016 California State Assembly 66th district election
Primary election
Party	Candidate	Votes	%
Democratic	Al Muratsuchi	53,295	48.7
Republican	David Hadley (incumbent)	48,755	44.6
Democratic	Mike Madrigal	7,307	6.7
Total votes		109,357	100.0
General election
Democratic	Al Muratuschi	105,336	54.1
Republican	David Hadley (incumbent)	89,308	45.9
Total votes		194,644	100.0
Democratic gain from Republican			

2018 California State Assembly 66th district election
Primary election
Party	Candidate	Votes	%
Democratic	Al Muratsuchi (incumbent)	47,976	50.9
Republican	Frank A. Scotto	40,727	43.2
Democratic	Caney Arnold	5,612	6.0
Total votes		88,703	100.0
General election
Democratic	Al Muratsuchi (incumbent)	108,627	60.5
Republican	Frank A. Scotto	71,057	39.5
Total votes		179,684	100.0
Democratic hold			

2020 California State Assembly 66th district election
Primary election
Party	Candidate	Votes	%
Democratic	Al Muratsuchi (incumbent)	83,172	66.2
Republican	Arthur C. Schaper	42,536	33.8
Total votes		125,708	100.0
General election
Democratic	Al Muratsuchi (incumbent)	145,874	63.2
Republican	Arthur C. Schaper	84,867	36.8
Total votes		230,741	100.0
Democratic hold			

2022 California State Assembly 66th district election
Primary election
Party	Candidate	Votes	%
Democratic	Al Muratsuchi (incumbent)	67,618	61.7
Republican	George Barks	41,918	38.3
Total votes		109,536	100.0
General election
Democratic	Al Muratsuchi (incumbent)	99,280	59.9
Republican	George Barks	66,332	40.1
Total votes		165,612	100.0
Democratic hold			

2024 California State Assembly 66th district election
Primary election
Party	Candidate	Votes	%
Democratic	Al Muratsuchi (incumbent)	67,838	59.1
Republican	George Barks	46,910	40.9
Total votes		114,748	100.0
General election
Democratic	Al Muratsuchi (incumbent)	131,680	60.2
Republican	George Barks	86,986	39.8
Total votes		218,666	100.0
Democratic hold			

2026 California Superintendent of Public Instruction election
Candidate	Votes	%
Sonja Shaw	1,737,735	22.64
Richard Barrera	1,558,298	20.30
Nichelle M. Henderson	738,236	9.62
Wendy Castaneda Leal	675,968	8.81
Al Muratsuchi	646,329	8.42
Anthony Rendon	624,266	8.13
Frank Lara	578,171	7.53
Josh Newman	522,758	6.81
Ainye Long	426,104	5.55
Gus Mattammal	167,723	2.19
Total votes	7,675,588	100.0
