= James E. Stockwell =

American politician

Member of the California State Assembly from the 66th district
- In office January 5, 1931 – January 2, 1933
- Preceded by: William Matthew Byrne Sr.
- Succeeded by: James J. Boyle

Member of the California State Assembly from the 73rd district
- In office January 7, 1929 – January 5, 1931
- Preceded by: Howard W. Davis
- Succeeded by: Isaac Jones

Personal details
- Born: December 14, 1876 Iowa, US
- Died: July 23, 1948 (aged 71) Orange County, California, US
- Party: Republican
- Spouse: Maud A Stockwell
- Children: 4

James Edward Stockwell (December 14, 1876 – July 23, 1948) was a Republican who served in the California State Assembly between 1929 and 1933, serving in Assembly Districts 73rd and 66th. He was born on December 14, 1876, and at the age of 22 served in the United States Army during the Spanish–American War. He died on July 23, 1948, in Orange County, California.
