= James J. Boyle =

American politician

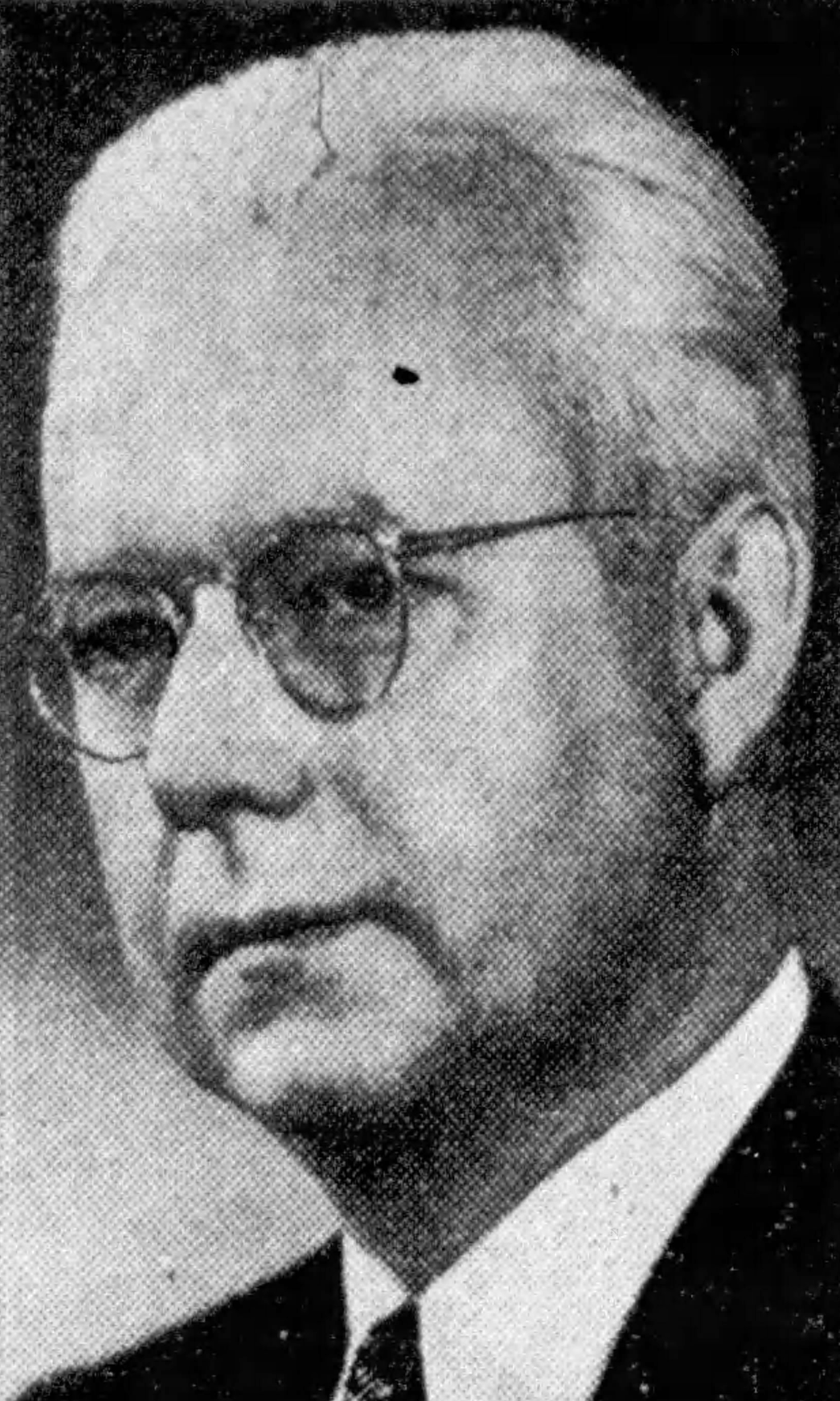
- Boyle c. 1938

Member of the California State Assembly from the 66th district
- In office January 2, 1933 - January 2, 1939
- Preceded by: James E. Stockwell
- Succeeded by: Jack Massion

Personal details
- Born: November 15, 1891 New York, New York, US
- Died: June 7, 1970 (aged 78) California, US
- Party: Democratic
- Spouse: Ruth Wisman Boyle
- Children: 2

Military service
- Branch/service: United States Army
- Battles/wars: World War I

James Joseph Boyle (November 15, 1891 - June 7, 1970) served in the California State Assembly for the 66th district from 1933 to 1939 and during World War I he served in the United States Army. He was an unsuccessful candidate for the State Board of Equalization and Congress in 1938.

Boyle was one of two dozen "EPIC Democrats" elected to the state legislature in 1934.
