= Dennis Hollingsworth =

American politician

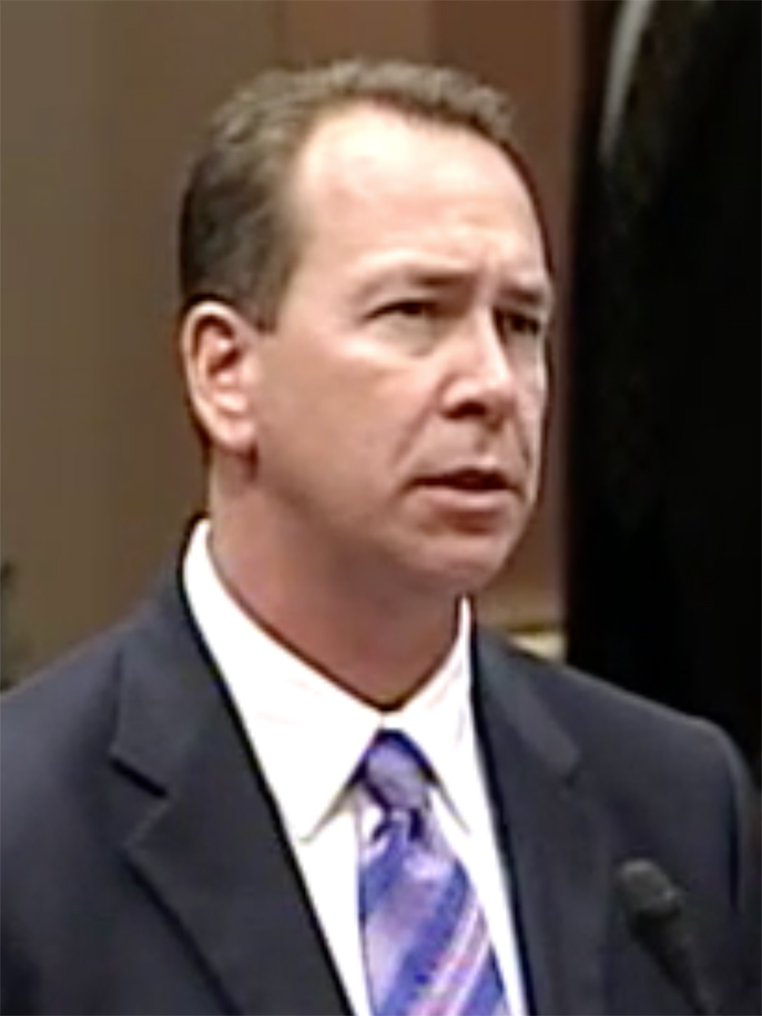
- Hollingsworth in 2010

Member of the California Senate from the 36th district
- In office December 2, 2002 – November 30, 2010
- Preceded by: Ray Haynes
- Succeeded by: Joel Anderson

Member of the California State Assembly from the 66th district
- In office December 4, 2000 – November 30, 2002
- Preceded by: Bruce Thompson
- Succeeded by: Ray Haynes

Minority Leader of the California Senate
- In office February 18, 2008 – October 11, 2010
- Preceded by: Dave Cogdill
- Succeeded by: Bob Dutton

Personal details
- Born: January 12, 1967 (age 59) Hemet, California
- Party: Republican
- Spouse: Natalie
- Children: 3
- Education: California Polytechnic State University; Cornell University

Dennis Clark Hollingsworth (born January 12, 1967) is an American politician who represented California's 36th State Senate district, which includes portions of San Diego and Riverside County, from 2002 to 2010. In 2000, Hollingsworth was elected to the Legislature as a member of the Assembly, and in 2002, Hollingsworth was elected to the Senate. Hollingsworth served as the California State Senate Minority Leader from 2008 until he termed out of the Senate in 2010.

Hollingsworth was affiliated with the conservative group ProtectMarriage.com and was instrumental in their unsuccessful legal battle to uphold the ban on same-sex marriage in California. As such, he is the named appellant in Hollingsworth v. Perry.

== Background ==
Hollingsworth attended the California Polytechnic State University and Cornell University where he studied Dairy Science, Agricultural Management and International Relations. He was a business owner and Legislative Director for the Riverside County Farm Bureau prior to his election to the State Legislature. Hollingsworth is an avid hunter and past state chairman of Quail Unlimited.

Hollingsworth lives in Murrieta with his wife, Natalie, and two sons and one daughter.

== Political career ==
Hollingsworth was elected to the California State Assembly in 2000 and the State Senate in 2002.

In 2006, he authored a resolution to replace the statue of Thomas Starr King, a Unitarian minister who worked to keep California in the Union during the American Civil War, with one of Ronald Reagan in Statuary Hall. One of his reasons was that he had never heard of King, and felt that someone more widely known should represent California. Hollingsworth also believed that the King statue would serve a better educational purpose being placed in the state capital. The bill passed the Senate and Assembly on August 31, 2006.

Shortly after midnight on the morning of February 18, 2009, after several days of late-night, contentious debates over closing a $42 billion gap in the state budget, Senate Republicans met in caucus where they voted to replace State Senate Republican Leader Dave Cogdill with Hollingsworth as minority leader. Hollingsworth immediately repudiated a budget deal negotiated by Cogsdill because it included increases in the sales, income and gasoline taxes, saying "We should reopen negotiations and we should pass a no-tax budget." The Cogdill-negotiated budget eventually passed regardless.

In 2010, Hollingsworth retired from the Senate due to term limits.
