= California Border Police Initiative =

Proposed referendum

The California Border Police Initiative was a proposed state ballot initiative seeking to amend the California Constitution to create a new state law enforcement agency called the "California Border Police." Proponents of the initiative failed in their effort to gather enough signatures to get it on the June 2006 statewide ballot.

Backers described the proposal as necessary to assist the U.S. Border Patrol's enforcement of federal immigration laws. However, opponents pointed out that the proposed state immigration police force would not be limited to the international border area, but rather have a much broader charge of enforcing federal immigration laws throughout the state.

Since federal immigration law enforcement has traditionally been the exclusive province of the federal government, there is considerable dispute regarding the constitutionality of civil immigration law enforcement by state and local authorities. The measure was sure to have faced legal challenges if approved by voters in California.

Before proponents failed to get it on the state ballot, the measure faltered in the Assembly Judiciary Committee of the California State Legislature when first introduced by Assembly Member Ray Haynes (R-Murrieta). They then introduced it as an initiative proposal and had until December 12, 2005 to collect approximately 600,000 valid signatures of registered California voters in order to qualify the measure for the ballot.

Proponents of the measure projected annual costs of up to $300 million for the new law enforcement department. The proposal did not make a funding allocation, but did authorize the Governor to use emergency powers to reallocate funding appropriated for other purposes in the annual state budget. It also called on the state to seek federal reimbursement for costs to the state in enforcing federal immigration laws. To date, the federal administration has not indicated whether or not it supports the aims of this proposal, or whether a federal appropriation would have been made if the measure was approved by California voters.

Proponents of the measure argued that the initiative was necessary to address the rate of illegal immigration to California and its strain on state resources. The Pew Hispanic Center estimates 10,400,000 illegal immigrants reside in the United States, and somewhere between 2 and 3 million are estimated to live and work in California.

Opponents of the proposal said that the state immigration police force would disrupt and interfere with the jurisdictions of local police departments around the state. They argued that the initiative would therefore undermine the ability of local police departments to protect the public if immigrant communities, especially domestic violence victims, fear reporting crimes because of potential immigration law consequences They also argued that a state immigration police force would invite racial profiling.

The chairman of the "California Border Police Committee," the official entity responsible for raising funds and making expenditures on behalf of the proposed initiative, was Assembly Member Haynes. The predecessor to the committee is Rescue California, the leading signature-gathering group for the 2003 California Recall of former Governor Gray Davis.
