= Gerald R. Eaves =

American politician (born 1939)

Gearld R. Eaves

Member of the California State Assembly from the 66th district
- In office December 3, 1984 – November 30, 1992
- Preceded by: Terry Goggin
- Succeeded by: Ray Haynes

Personal details
- Born: May 17, 1939 (age 87) Miami, Arizona
- Party: Democratic
- Spouse(s): Susan; Lisbeth
- Children: 5

Gerald R. Eaves (born May 17, 1939, in Miami, Arizona) is a former California State Assemblyman who served from 1984 until 1992. He served on the Rialto City Council from 1977 until 1980 and as Mayor of Rialto from 1980 until 1984. After leaving the Assembly, he served on the San Bernardino County Board of Supervisors from 1992 until 2000.

Political offices
Preceded by Terry Goggin	California State Assemblyman, 66th District; December 3, 1984 – November 30, 1992	Succeeded by Ray Haynes
