= David Hadley =

American politician from California

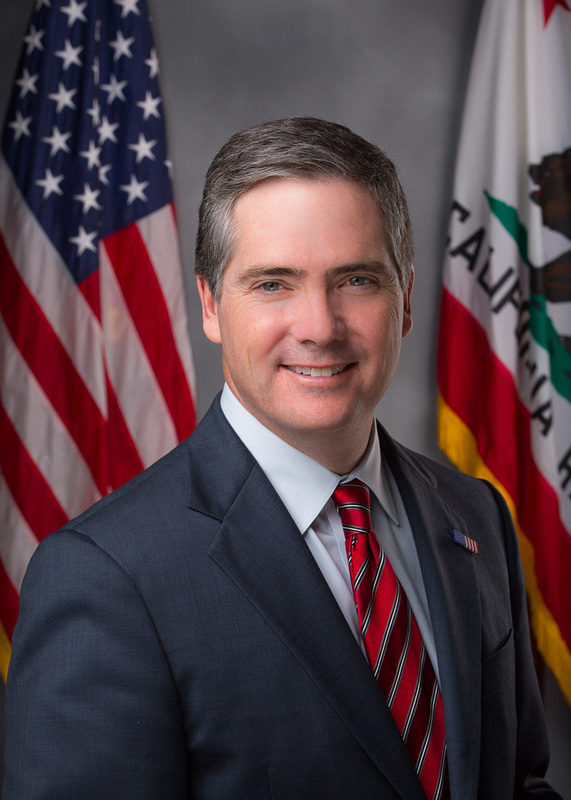

Member of the California State Assembly from the 66th district
- In office December 1, 2014 – November 30, 2016
- Preceded by: Al Muratsuchi
- Succeeded by: Al Muratsuchi

Personal details
- Born: David Frederick Hadley; November 14, 1964 (age 61) Fullerton, California, U.S.
- Party: Republican
- Spouse: Suzanne Hoff
- Children: 4
- Education: Dartmouth College (BA); London School of Economics (MS)
- Website: Official website

David Frederick Hadley (born November 14, 1964) is an American businessman and former politician, who served in the California State Assembly, representing the 66th Assembly District, which consists of most of the South Bay region of Los Angeles. He is a member of the Republican Party.

On November 4, 2014, Hadley defeated Democratic assembly member Al Muratsuchi by a margin of just 706 votes in an upset. In 2016, Hadley was defeated in his own bid for reelection in a rematch with Muratsuchi. Prior to serving in the California State Assembly, Hadley was the Republican party chairman for the 66th assembly district and an entrepreneur and investment banker.

== Early life and education ==
Hadley was born and raised in Fullerton, California and graduated from Servite High School in Anaheim. He received his bachelor's degrees in both Economics and History from Dartmouth College (1986), and he completed his Master of Science in Economic History at the London School of Economics (1994).

== Business career ==
From 1986 to 1999, Hadley was an employee of BT Alex Brown and its predecessors and affiliates, including BT Securities Corporation and Bankers Trust Company. During his employment he worked in New York and Atlanta, and moved with the firm to Los Angeles in 1996. When Hadley resigned in June 1999 upon the acquisition of BT Alex Brown by Deutsche Bank, he was a managing director in the media & communications investment banking group. In June 1999, Hadley founded Hadley Partners, Incorporated.

== Political background and experience ==
Hadley previously served as the chairman of the Beach Cities Republicans.

In June 2012, Hadley was elected to the board of the Republican Party of Los Angeles County, representing the 66th Assembly District.

After election to public office, Hadley created the South Bay 300 Club which raised funds for his 2016 re-election campaign, charging $1000 for admission to the club.

In September 2016, Hadley announced he would not vote or support the Republican nominee for the presidency, Donald Trump. He said "I am not voting for either Secretary Clinton or Mr. Trump. Both have shown themselves unfit for the highest office in the land. Neither reflects the South Bay values that this citizen legislator is trying to bring to Sacramento."

In July 2017, Hadley declared his candidacy for Governor of California in 2018; he withdrew from the race two weeks later.

=== 2014 California State Assembly ===
California's 66th State Assembly district election, 2014
Primary election
| Party | Candidate | Votes | % |
|---|---|---|---|
| Republican | David Hadley | 30,996 | 50.5 |
| Democratic | Al Muratsuchi (incumbent) | 30,439 | 49.5 |
| Total votes | | 61,435 | 100.0 |
General election
| Republican | David Hadley | 54,401 | 50.3 |
| Democratic | Al Muratsuchi (incumbent) | 53,695 | 49.7 |
| Total votes | | 108,096 | 100.0 |
| Republican gain from Democratic | | | |

=== 2016 California State Assembly ===
California's 66th State Assembly district election, 2016
Primary election
| Party | Candidate | Votes | % |
|---|---|---|---|
| Democratic | Al Muratsuchi | 53,295 | 48.7 |
| Republican | David Hadley (incumbent) | 48,755 | 44.6 |
| Democratic | Mike Madrigal | 7,307 | 6.7 |
| Total votes | | 109,357 | 100.0 |
General election
| Democratic | Al Muratsuchi | 105,336 | 54.1 |
| Republican | David Hadley (incumbent) | 89,308 | 45.9 |
| Total votes | | 194,644 | 100.0 |
| Democratic gain from Republican | | | |

== Legislative tenure ==
In 2015, Hadley authored AB 306 to give the children of military personnel better options in choosing which school district they matriculate into, regardless of on-base housing's location, which was signed into law. He worked with environmentalist Erin Brockovich to increase awareness of water quality in the city of Gardena in 2015–16.

== Personal life ==
Hadley married Suzanne Hoff Hadley in June 1992. They have four children: Jack, Claire, Ellen and Faith. They have lived in Manhattan Beach, California since 1996.
