= Chuck Washington (politician) =

Californian politician

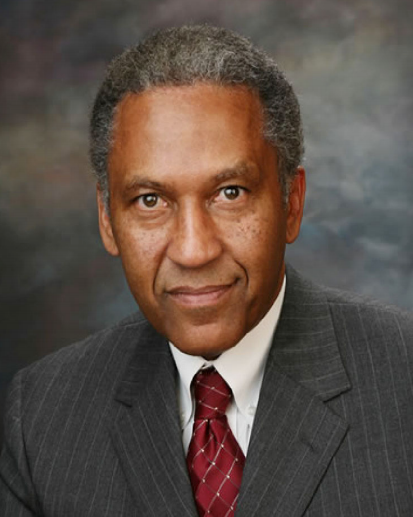

Chair of the Riverside County Board of Supervisors
- In office January 09, 2024 – January 07, 2025
- Preceded by: Kevin Jeffries
- Succeeded by: V. Manuel Perez

Vice Chair of the Riverside County Board of Supervisors
- In office January 10, 2023 – January 09, 2024
- Preceded by: Kevin Jeffries
- Succeeded by: V. Manuel Perez

Riverside County Supervisor, 3rd District
- Incumbent
- Assumed office March 10, 2015
- Preceded by: Jeff Stone

Mayor of Temecula
- In office January 9, 2007 – January 8, 2008
- Preceded by: Ron Roberts
- Succeeded by: Mike Naggar

Mayor of Murrieta
- In office 1995–1999
- Preceded by: Not known
- Succeeded by: Not known

Personal details
- Born: Abt. 1953
- Party: Democratic
- Spouse: Kathy

Military service
- Allegiance: United States
- Branch/service: United States Navy

Chuck Washington is an American politician from California. Since 2015, he serves on the Riverside County Board of Supervisors in Riverside County, California.

== Election history ==
=== 2020 Riverside County Board of Supervisors, District 3 ===
Riverside County Board of Supervisors, District 3, 2020
Primary election
Candidate	Votes	%
Chuck Washington (incumbent)	54,833	55.3
Courtney Sheehan	13,103	13.2
Joe Scarafone	12,932	13.1
Edison Gomez-Krauss	9,140	9.2
Mike Juárez	9,080	9.2
Total votes	99,088	100.0
General election
Chuck Washington (incumbent)		
Courtney Sheehan		
Total votes		

=== 2016 Riverside County Board of Supervisors, District 3 ===
Riverside County Board of Supervisors, District 3, 2016
Primary election
Candidate	Votes	%
Chuck Washington (incumbent)	31,083	39.98
Shellie Milne	24,220	31.16
Randon Lane	22,437	28.86
Total votes	77,740	100.00
General election
Chuck Washington (incumbent)	86,442	58.60
Shellie Milne	61,075	41.40
Total votes	147,517	100.00
