= Kevin Jeffries =

American politician

Chair of the Riverside County Board of Supervisors
- In office January 10, 2023 – January 09, 2024
- Preceded by: Jeff Hewitt
- Succeeded by: Chuck Washington

Vice Chair of the Riverside County Board of Supervisors
- In office January 11, 2022 – January 10, 2023
- Chair: Jeff Hewitt
- Preceded by: Jeff Hewitt
- Succeeded by: Chuck Washington

Riverside County Supervisor, 1st District
- In office January 8, 2013 – January 7, 2025
- Preceded by: Bob Buster
- Succeeded by: Jose Medina

Member of the California State Assembly from the 66th district
- In office December 4, 2006 – November 30, 2012
- Preceded by: Ray Haynes
- Succeeded by: Al Muratsuchi

Personal details
- Born: November 24, 1964 (age 61) Downey, California
- Party: Republican
- Spouse: Christina Jeffries
- Children: 2
- Education: Riverside Community College
- Occupation: President, Maxson Investments
- Website: Official Website

Kevin D. Jeffries (born November 24, 1964) is an American politician from the State of California. He is a Riverside County Supervisor and a former member of the California State Assembly representing the California's 66th Assembly district. Jeffries is a member of the Republican Party.

Prior to his election, Jeffries served seven years as chairman of the Republican Party of Riverside County, California and served as a delegate to the California Republican Party and its executive committee, platform committee and County Chairmen's Association.

On October 1, 2021, Jeffries announced that he would not seek reelection in 2024 and would retire from public office after his term ends.

He lives in Lake Elsinore, California with his wife, he has two adult children.

== Election history ==
=== Riverside County Board of Supervisors, District 1 ===
2020 Election
Primary election
Candidate	Votes	%
Kevin D. Jeffries (incumbent)	42,062	50.50
Melissa A. Bourbonnais	20,823	25.00
Debbie Walsh	20,406	24.50
Total votes	83,291	100.00

2016 Election
Primary election
Candidate	Votes	%
Kevin D. Jeffries (incumbent)	39,840	58.21
Debbie Walsh	18,869	27.57
Britt Holmstrom	9,737	14.23
Total votes	68,446	100.00

2012 Election
Primary election
Candidate	Votes	%
Bob Buster (incumbent)	16,335	38.22
Kevin Jeffries	13,540	31.68
Mike Soubirous	12,868	30.11
Total votes	42,743	100.00
General election
Kevin Jeffries	57,573	50.56
Bob Buster (incumbent)	56,300	49.44
Total votes	113,873	100.00

=== California State Assembly, District 66 ===
California's 66th State Assembly district election, 2010
Party	Candidate	Votes	%
Republican	Kevin Jeffries (incumbent)	81,176	64.8
Democratic	Douglas P. Dye	44,134	35.2
Total votes		125,310	100.0
Republican hold			

California's 66th State Assembly district election, 2008
Party	Candidate	Votes	%
Republican	Kevin Jeffries (incumbent)	95,093	57.94
Democratic	Grey Frandsen	69,040	42.06
Total votes		164,133	100.00
Turnout			72.77
Republican hold			

California's 66th State Assembly district election, 2006
Party	Candidate	Votes	%
Republican	Kevin Jeffries	62,582	61.56
Democratic	Laurel Nicholson	39,081	38.44
Total votes		101,663	100.00
Turnout			49.29
Republican hold			

== Notable achievements ==
- He is responsible for Old Highway 395 being declared historic.
