= Brian Goggin (artist) =

American installation artist

- Born: 1965 or 1966 (age 60–61)
- Education: UCSB; Homerton College; San Francisco State University
- Notable work: Defenestration (1997)
- Website: www.metaphorm.org

Brian Goggin is an American sculptor and installation artist. His art openings often include extravagant performance art themed block parties. His studio is based in the Mission District of San Francisco.

== Early life ==
Goggin was an army brat and moved often in his early childhood. He grew up in Davis and San Bernardino, California. His father is former California State Assemblyman Terry Goggin.

Goggin studied filmmaking and painting at the University of California, Santa Barbara. From there, he studied art and English literature at Homerton College, Cambridge through UCSB's study abroad program from 1986 to 1988. He moved to San Francisco in 1988. After graduation, he worked for two years under sculptor David Mach in London.

He is a member of the Dadaist Cacophony Society.

== Career ==
=== Defenestration (1997) ===
Defenestration was an outdoor installation on the side of the Hugo Hotel on Howard Street and 6th Street in San Francisco. Goggin referred to it as "madcap furniturama." It is a part of a series of installations wherein Goggin installed animated furniture. The steel frameworks were created by blacksmith Morgan Raimond.

The hotel has been vacant since a fire in 1988 and was damaged by the 1989 Loma Prieta earthquake. The prototype installation in December 1996 was removed after a hazard call from a civilian.

The original installation was done with volunteering help from the Cacophony Society, of which Goggin was an active member. It was inaugurated on March 9, 1997, with what Goggin called an "urban circus". It consisted of 34 contorted furniture pieces, such as tables and chairs. It costed $7,000, funded in part from the National Endowment for the Arts as part of its last set of individual artist grants.

The city bought the hotel in 2008, with the intentions of converting it into affordable housing through the Mercy Housing non-profit. There was a major refurbishment in 2010 before it was uninstalled on June 3, 2014, prior to the hotel's demolishment the following September. Prior to the deinstallation, Goggin hosted various art happenings to remember Defenestration. Pieces from the installation were auctioned from $650 to $35,000 through a fine arts gallery to fund the deinstallation and future projects.

=== Caruso’s Dream (2014) ===
And My Room Still Rocks Like a Boat on the Sea (Caruso's Dream) is a public site-specific artwork joint production between Goggin and Dorka Keehn located at 55 Ninth St., San Francisco. It was commissioned through the Black Rock Arts Foundation for $750,000 by AVA 55 Ninth, a 17-story apartment building.

It is inspired by the moment when opera singer Enrico Caruso was awakened by the 1906 San Francisco earthquake while staying at the Palace Hotel in San Francisco. Goggins said that Caruso "did not know if he was awake or still dreaming as he was walking to the window to see the results of the ongoing earthquake." It is also inspired by a piece of SOMA history, wherein a grand piano was used to plug a sinkhole.

It features 13 one-ton replica glass and steel pianos straddled onto the side of the apartment building, 25 feet off the ground. For the project, Goggin and Keehn sourced material that were rooted in the neighborhood's industrial history. They collected 900 pieces of chicken-wire glass of different colors and textures. The wooden struts that supported the piano were salvaged from the old San Francisco Transbay Terminal. The ropes tied onto the pianos were modeled after nautical ropes used by longshoremen.

For the opening, Goggin planned a New Orleans-style parade in which 13 working pianos, 13 pianists, and 3 opera singers were wheeled from Defenestration to Caruso's Dream. The sound of Caruso singing was broadcast on the KPH radio station on 90.9FM from Palace hotel, where it once was headquartered. Gabriel Rey-Goodlatte was commissioned to synchronize the lights from the pianos with the Caruso broadcast. The lights and music were intended to be permanent additions. Goggin stated that the opening was supposed to parallel online congregation, saying "Where now, communities gather around these tech devices, it reminds me of people gathering around these pianos that were a product of the Industrial Revolution."

== Influences ==
Goggin cites Federico Fellini as his principal influence, along with Werner Herzog's Fitzcarraldo.

== Personal life ==
Goggin was the designer and part owner of the Preserve24 restaurant on the Lower East Side of Manhattan.
