= U60 =

U60 may refer to:

- Big Creek Airport (Idaho)
- German submarine U-60, various vessels
- HMS Alacrity (U60), a sloop of the Royal Navy
- Inverted snub dodecadodecahedron
- Small nucleolar RNA SNORD60
