= Reed Ranch Airport =

- IATA: none; ICAO: none; FAA LID: I92

Summary
- Airport type: Public
- Owner: Idaho Division of Aeronautics / USFS
- Serves: Yellow Pine, Idaho
- Elevation AMSL: 4,157 ft / 1,267 m
- Coordinates: 44°53′30″N 115°42′47″W

Map
- Location of airport in Idaho I92 (the United States)

Runways
Direction	Length		Surface
Direction	ft	m	Surface
16/34	2,175	663	Dirt
- Source: Federal Aviation Administration

Reed Ranch Airport (FAA LID: I92, formerly ID93) is a public use airport located 12 nautical miles (14 mi, 22 km) southwest of the central business district of Yellow Pine, in Valley County, Idaho, United States. It is owned by the Idaho Division of Aeronautics / USFS.

== Facilities ==
Reed Ranch Airport resides at elevation of 4,157 feet (1,267 m) above mean sea level. It has one runway designated 16/34 with a dirt surface measuring 2,175 by 100 feet (663 x 30 m).

== See also ==
- Johnson Creek Airport (FAA: 3U2), located 3 nautical miles (6 km) south of Yellow Pine, at 44°54′42″N 115°29′08″W
- List of airports in Idaho
