= U41 =

U41 may refer to:

- Ditrigonal dodecadodecahedron
- Dubois Municipal Airport (Idaho)
- German submarine U-41, various vessels
- SM U-41 (Austria-Hungary), a submarine of the Austro-Hungarian Navy
- Small nucleolar RNA SNORD41
- U41, a line of the Dortmund Stadtbahn
