= U61 =

U61 may refer to:

- German submarine U-61, various vessels
- Great dodecicosidodecahedron
- Small nucleolar RNA SNORD61
- Twin Bridges Airport (Idaho)
- Uppland Runic Inscription 61
