= List of airports in Idaho =

This is a list of airports in Idaho (a U.S. state), grouped by type and sorted by location. It contains all public-use and military airports in the state. Some private-use and former airports may be included where notable, such as airports that were previously public-use, those with commercial enplanements recorded by the FAA or airports assigned an IATA airport code.

== Airports ==
This list contains the following information:

- **City served** – The city generally associated with the airport, as per the airport's master record with the Federal Aviation Administration. This is not always the actual location since some airports are located in smaller towns outside of the city they serve. It is not meant to be a complete list of cities served, which can be found in or added to each airport's Wikipedia article.
- **FAA** – The location identifier assigned by the Federal Aviation Administration (FAA). These are linked to each airport's page at the Idaho Transportation Department.
- **IATA** – The airport code assigned by the International Air Transport Association (IATA). Those that do not match the FAA code are shown in bold.
- **ICAO** – The location indicator assigned by the International Civil Aviation Organization (ICAO).
- **Airport name** – The official airport name. Those shown in **bold** indicate the airport has scheduled passenger service on commercial airlines.
- **Role** – One of four FAA airport categories, as per the 2020–2025 National Plan of Integrated Airport Systems (NPIAS) report released September 2020:
  - P-s: Commercial service – primary are publicly owned airports that receive scheduled passenger service and have more than 10,000 passenger boardings (enplanements) each year. Each primary airport is sub-classified by the FAA as one of the following four "hub" types (s):
    - L: Large hub that accounts for at least 1% of total U.S. passenger enplanements.
    - M: Medium hub that accounts for between 0.25% and 1% of total U.S. passenger enplanements.
    - S: Small hub that accounts for between 0.05% and 0.25% of total U.S. passenger enplanements.
    - N: Nonhub that accounts for less than 0.05% of total U.S. passenger enplanements, but more than 10,000 annual enplanements.
  - CS: Commercial service – nonprimary are publicly owned airports that receive scheduled passenger service and have at least 2,500 passenger boardings each year.
  - R: Reliever airports are designated by the FAA to relieve congestion at a large commercial service airport and to provide more general aviation access to the overall community.
  - GA: General aviation airports are the largest single group of airports in the U.S. airport system. They are public-use airports that do not have scheduled service or have scheduled service with less than 2,500 passenger boardings each year.
- **Enplanements** – The number of enplanements (commercial passenger boardings) that occurred at the airport in calendar year 2024, as per FAA records released 2025.

| City served | FAA | IATA | ICAO | Airport name | Role | Enplanements (2024) |
|---|---|---|---|---|---|---|
| | | | | **Commercial service – primary airports** | | |
| Boise | BOI | BOI | KBOI | **Boise Airport** (Boise Air Terminal) (Gowen Field) | P-M | 2,475,370 |
| Hailey / Sun Valley | SUN | SUN | KSUN | **Friedman Memorial Airport** | P-N | 121,123 |
| Idaho Falls | IDA | IDA | KIDA | **Idaho Falls Regional Airport** (Fanning Field) | P-N | 301,674 |
| Lewiston | LWS | LWS | KLWS | **Lewiston–Nez Perce County Airport** | P-N | 55,467 |
| Pocatello | PIH | PIH | KPIH | **Pocatello Regional Airport** | P-N | 24,610 |
| Twin Falls | TWF | TWF | KTWF | **Magic Valley Regional Airport** (Joslin Field) | P-N | 31,734 |
| | | | | **Reliever airports** | | |
| Caldwell | EUL | | KEUL | Caldwell Industrial Airport | R | 0 |
| | | | | **General aviation airports** | | |
| Aberdeen | U36 | | | Aberdeen Municipal Airport | GA | 0 |
| Arco | AOC | | KAOC | Arco-Butte County Airport (Pope Field) | GA | 0 |
| Blackfoot | U02 | | | McCarley Field | GA | 3 |
| Bonners Ferry | 65S | | | Boundary County Airport | GA | 0 |
| Buhl | U03 | | | Buhl Municipal Airport | GA | 0 |
| Burley | BYI | BYI | KBYI | Burley Municipal Airport | GA | 0 |
| Cascade | U70 | ICS | | Cascade Airport | GA | 0 |
| Challis | LLJ | **CHL** | KLLJ | Challis Airport | GA | 0 |
| Coeur d'Alene | COE | COE | KCOE | Coeur d'Alene Airport (Pappy Boyington Field) (was Coeur d'Alene Air Terminal) | GA | 159 |
| Council | U82 | | | Council Municipal Airport | GA | 0 |
| Driggs | DIJ | | KDIJ | Driggs-Reed Memorial Airport | GA | 36 |
| Gooding | GNG | GNG | KGNG | Gooding Municipal Airport | GA | 3 |
| Grangeville | GIC | | KGIC | Idaho County Airport | GA | 0 |
| Homedale | S66 | | | Homedale Municipal Airport | GA | 0 |
| Jerome | JER | | KJER | Jerome County Airport | GA | 0 |
| Kamiah | S73 | | | Kamiah Municipal Airport | GA | 0 |
| Kellogg | S83 | | | Shoshone County Airport | GA | 0 |
| McCall | MYL | MYL | KMYL | **McCall Municipal Airport** | GA | 35 |
| Mountain Home | U76 | | | Mountain Home Municipal Airport | GA | 0 |
| Nampa | MAN | | KMAN | Nampa Municipal Airport | GA | 0 |
| Orofino | S68 | | | Orofino Municipal Airport | GA | 0 |
| Paris | 1U7 | | | Bear Lake County Airport | GA | 0 |
| Preston | U10 | | | Preston Airport | GA | 0 |
| Priest River | 1S6 | | | Priest River Municipal Airport | GA | 0 |
| Rexburg | RXE | RXE | KRXE | Rexburg-Madison County Airport | GA | 0 |
| St. Maries | S72 | | | St. Maries Municipal Airport | GA | 0 |
| Salmon | SMN | SMN | KSMN | **Lemhi County Airport** | GA | 1 |
| Sandpoint | SZT | | KSZT | Sandpoint Airport (Dave Wall Field) | GA | 19 |
| Weiser | S87 | | | Weiser Municipal Airport | GA | 0 |
| | | | | **Other public-use airports** (not listed in NPIAS) | | |
| American Falls | U01 | | | American Falls Airport | | |
| Atlanta | 55H | | | Atlanta Airport | | |
| Atomic City | U37 | | | Midway Airport | | |
| Atomic City | U46 | | | Big Southern Butte Airport | | |
| Atomic City | U48 | | | Coxs Well Airport | | |
| Bancroft | U51 | | | Bancroft Municipal Airport | | |
| Big Creek | U60 | | | Big Creek Airport | | |
| Carey | U65 | | | Carey Airport | | |
| Carey | 0U7 | | | Hollow Top Airport | | |
| Cavanaugh Bay | D28 | | | Tanglefoot Seaplane Base | | |
| Challis | D47 | | | Cougar Ranch Airport | | |
| Challis | C53 | | | Lower Loon Creek Airport (was Lower Loon Creek USFS Airport) | | |
| Challis | ID8 | | | Marble Creek Airport | | |
| Coeur d'Alene | S77 | | | Magee Airport | | |
| Coeur d'Alene | S76 | | | Brooks Seaplane Base | | |
| Coolin | 66S | | | Cavanaugh Bay Airport | | |
| Cottonwood | S84 | | | Cottonwood Municipal Airport | | |
| Craigmont | S89 | | | Craigmont Municipal Airport | | |
| Donnelly | U84 | | | Donald D. Coski Memorial Airport | | |
| Downey | U58 | | | Downey / Hyde Memorial Airport | | |
| Dubois | U41 | DBS | | Dubois Municipal Airport | | |
| Elk City | S90 | | | Elk City Airport | | |
| Emmett | S78 | | | Emmett Municipal Airport | | |
| Fairfield | U86 | | | Camas County Airport | | |
| Garden Valley | U88 | | | Garden Valley Airport | | |
| Glenns Ferry | U89 | | | Glenns Ferry Municipal Airport | | |
| Grasmere | U91 | | | Grasmere Airport | | |
| Grouse | U92 | | | Antelope Valley Airport | | |
| Hailey | U93 | | | Magic Reservoir Airport | | |
| Hazelton | U94 | | | Hazelton Municipal Airport | | |
| Howe | U97 | | | Howe Airport | | |
| Island Park | U53 | | | Henry's Lake Airport | | |
| Ketchum | U61 | | | Twin Bridges Airport | | |
| Kimama | U99 | | | Laidlaw Corrals Airport | | |
| Kooskia | S82 | | | Kooskia Municipal Airport | | |
| Leadore | U00 | | | Leadore Airport | | |
| Lewiston | 78U | | | Snake River Seaplane Base | | |
| Lowman | 0U1 | | | Warm Springs Creek Airport | | |
| Mackay | U62 | | | Mackay Airport | | |
| Mackay | 0U2 | | | Copper Basin Airport | | |
| Malad City | MLD | MLD | KMLD | Malad City Airport | | |
| May | 0U8 | | | May Airport | | |
| Midvale | 0U9 | | | Lee Williams Memorial Airport | | |
| Minidoka | 1U0 | | | Bear Trap Airport | | |
| Mud Lake | 1U2 | | | Mud Lake Airport (West Jefferson County Airport) | | |
| Murphy | 1U3 | | | Murphy Airport | | |
| New Meadows | 1U4 | | | New Meadows Airport | | |
| Nezperce | 0S5 | | | Nezperce Municipal Airport | | |
| Oakley | 1U6 | | | Oakley Municipal Airport | | |
| Orogrande | 75C | | | Orogrande Airport | | |
| Parma | 50S | | | Parma Airport | | |
| Payette | S75 | | | Payette Municipal Airport | | |
| Pine | 1U9 | | | Pine Airport | | |
| Porthill | 1S1 | | | Eckhart International Airport | | |
| Prairie | 2U0 | | | Smith Prairie Airport | | |
| Rigby | U56 | | | Rigby Airport (Rigby-Jefferson County Airport) | | |
| Rockford | 2U4 | | | Rockford Municipal Airport | | |
| St. Anthony | U12 | | | Stanford Field | | |
| Slate Creek | 1S7 | | | Slate Creek Airport | | |
| Smiley Creek | U87 | | | Smiley Creek Airport | | |
| Soda Springs | U78 | | | Allen H. Tigert Airport | | |
| Stanley | U63 | | | Bruce Meadows Airport | | |
| Stanley | 2U7 | | | Stanley Airport | | |
| Stanley | 2U8 | | | Thomas Creek Airport | | |
| Thatcher | 0ID | | | W E Ranch Airport | | |
| Three Creek | 3U0 | | | Murphy Hot Springs Airport | | |
| Winchester | I45 | | | Wapshilla Airport | | |
| Yellow Pine | 3U2 | | | Johnson Creek Airport | | |
| Yellow Pine | I92 | | | Reed Ranch Airport | | |
| | | | | **USFS (United States Forest Service) airports** | | |
| Atlanta | U45 | | | Graham USFS Airport | | |
| Atlanta | 52U | | | Weatherby USFS Airport | | |
| Bernard | U54 | | | Bernard USFS Airport | | |
| Big Creek Ranger Station | I08 | | | Cabin Creek USFS Airport | | |
| Cayuse Creek | C64 | | | Cayuse Creek USFS Airport | | |
| Challis | U72 | | | Upper Loon Creek USFS Airport | | |
| Chamberlain Guard Station | U79 | | | Chamberlain USFS Airport | | |
| Cold Meadows Guard Station | U81 | | | Cold Meadows USFS Airport | | |
| Dixie | A05 | | | Dixie USFS Airport | | |
| Dixie | C48 | | | Wilson Bar USFS Airport | | |
| Fish Lake | S92 | | | Fish Lake USFS Airport | | |
| Idaho City | U98 | | | Idaho City USFS Airport | | |
| Indian Creek | S81 | | | Indian Creek USFS Airport | | |
| Landmark | 0U0 | | | Landmark USFS Airport | | |
| Lucile | 1DA | | | Big Bar USFS Airport | | |
| Mahoney Creek | 0U3 | | | Mahoney Creek USFS Airport | | |
| McCall | 24K | | | Krassel USFS Airport | | |
| Moose Creek Ranger Station | 1U1 | | | Moose Creek USFS Airport | | |
| Nordman | 67S | | | Priest Lake USFS Airport | | |
| Shearer | 2U5 | | | Shearer USFS Airport | | |
| Soldier Bar | 85U | | | Soldier Bar USFS Airport | | |
| Warren | 3U1 | | | Warren USFS Airport | | |
| | | | | **Military airports** | | |
| Mountain Home | MUO | MUO | KMUO | Mountain Home Air Force Base | | 432 |
| | | | | **Notable private-use airports** | | |
| Coeur d'Alene | ID65 | | | Pisch's Place Airport | | |
| Lava Hot Springs | 01ID | | | Lava Hot Springs Airport (was FAA: 00E) | | |
| | | | | **Notable former airports** | | |
| Boise | ~~S65~~ | | | Strawberry Glenn Airport (closed 1980) | | |
| Glengary | ~~S96~~ | | | Lake Pend Oreille Seaplane Base | | |
| Idaho City | ~~73U~~ | | | Golden Age Mine Heliport | | |

NOTE: Moscow, Idaho, is served by the Pullman-Moscow Regional Airport (FAA: PUW), a commercial service – primary airport located four miles away in Pullman, Washington.

== See also ==
- Idaho World War II Army Airfields
- Wikipedia:WikiProject Aviation/Airline destination lists: North America#Idaho
