= S67 =

S67 may refer to:

- HMS Alliance (S67), a submarine of the Royal Navy
- Nampa Municipal Airport in Canyon County, Idaho, United States
- SIAI S.67, an Italian flying boat fighter
- Sikorsky S-67 Blackhawk, an American helicopter prototype
