= Big Creek Airport (Idaho) =

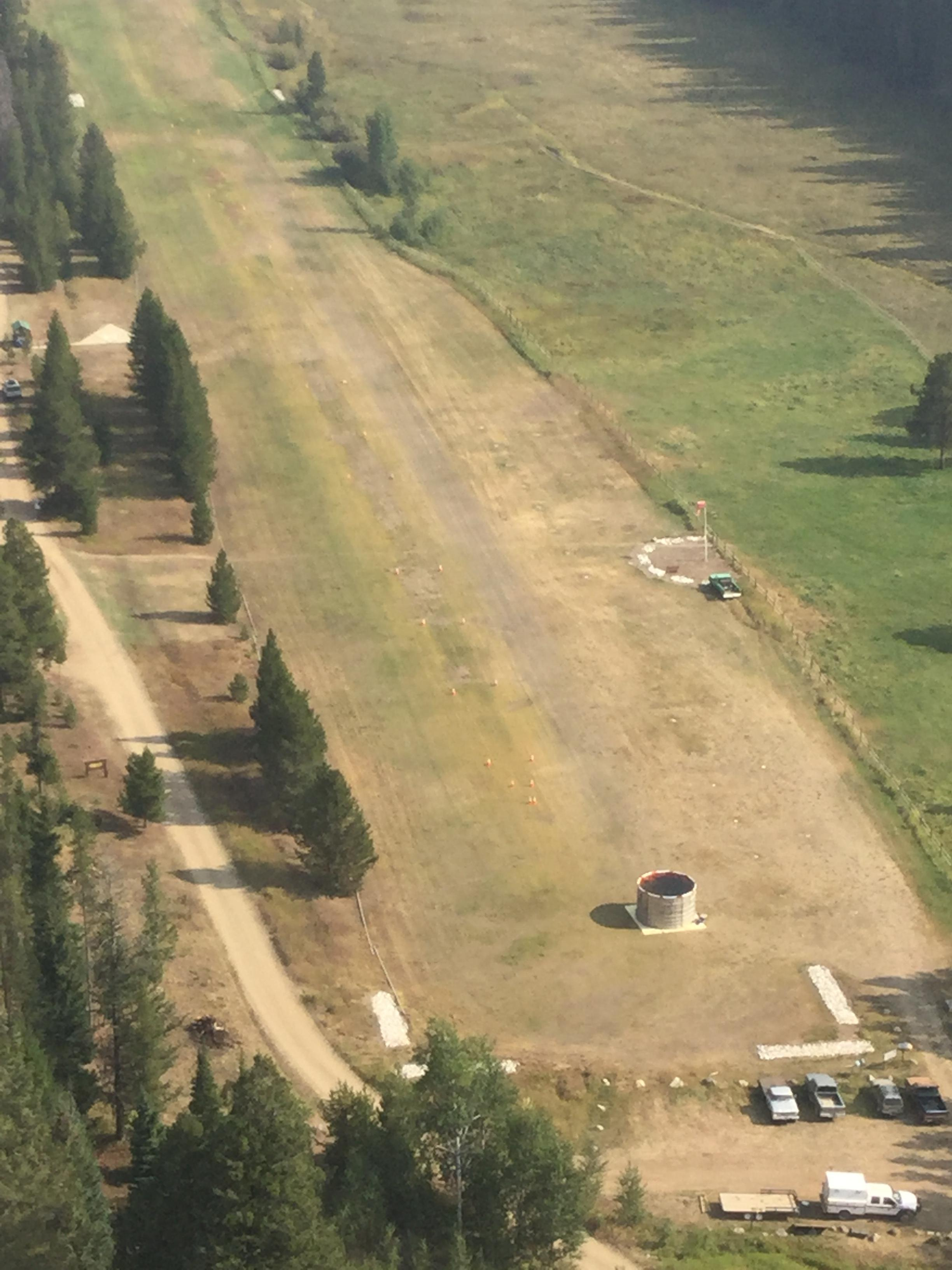
- IATA: none; ICAO: none; FAA LID: U60

Summary
- Airport type: Public
- Owner: State of Idaho - ITD Division of Aeronautics
- Location: Valley County, Idaho
- Elevation AMSL: 5,743 ft (1,750 m)
- Coordinates: 45°07′59″N 115°19′18″W

Map
- Location of airport in Idaho

Runways
Direction	Length		Surface
Direction	ft	m	Surface
1/19	3,550	1,082	Turf

Statistics (2010)
- Aircraft operations: 4,000
- Source: Federal Aviation Administration

Big Creek Airport (FAA LID: U60) is a Forest Service owned public-use airstrip in Valley County, Idaho, United States. The state of Idaho has a permit to perform maintenance. It is located 12 nautical miles (14 mi, 22 km) northeast of Yellow Pine, Idaho (44°57′54″N 115°29′37″W) and 17 nautical miles (20 mi, 31 km) west of the Cabin Creek USFS Airport (45°08′37″N 114°55′44″W). The airstrip is actually on Forest Service managed land. The state of Idaho Division of Aeronautics has a special use permit to perform annual maintenance on the strip and some facilities. The airport is located at the Big Creek Ranger Station (Forest Service Station- Not Ranger Station) in Payette National Forest, adjacent to the Big Creek Campground. The airstrip serves the Big Creek Lodge.

== Facilities and aircraft ==
Big Creek Airport covers an area of 13 acres (5.3 ha) at an elevation of 5,743 feet (1,750 m) above mean sea level. It has one runway designated 1/19 with a turf surface measuring 3,550 by 110 feet (1,082 x 34 m). For the 12-month period ending September 13, 2010, the airport had 4,000 aircraft operations, an average of 10 per day: 75% general aviation and 25% air taxi.

The airstrip is snow free from early May to late October, generally. During that period in 2010, there were 675 landings. During the winter, there is almost no use and skis are required.

== See also ==
- List of airports in Idaho
