= KPIH =

KPIH may refer to:

- Pocatello Regional Airport (ICAO code KPIH)
- KPIH-LP, a low-power radio station (98.9 FM) licensed to serve Payson, Arizona, United States
