= Dubois Municipal Airport =

Dubois Municipal Airport may refer to:

- Dubois Municipal Airport (Idaho) in Dubois, Clark County, Idaho, United States
- Dubois Municipal Airport (Wyoming) in Dubois, Fremont County, Wyoming, United States
