= Paris Airport =

Paris Airport may refer to:

- Paris Aéroport (formerly Aéroports de Paris or ADP), brand that serves international airports in Paris

Airports serving Paris, France:

- Charles de Gaulle Airport – Paris's main international airport
- Paris Orly Airport – Paris's second international airport
- Beauvais–Tillé Airport – the airport of Beauvais, serving as Paris airport for budget airlines
- Paris–Le Bourget Airport – the original city airport, now used for general aviation and the Air Show
- Châlons Vatry Airport – cargo airport at Châlons-en-Champagne, another airport serving as Paris airport for budget airlines

Airports in other places named Paris:

- Paris Municipal Airport in Paris, Arkansas, United States
- Bear Lake County Airport in Paris, Idaho, United States
- Edgar County Airport in Paris, Illinois, United States
- Henry County Airport (Tennessee) in Paris, Tennessee, United States
- Cox Field in Paris, Texas, United States
