= S72 =

S72 may refer to:

== Aviation ==
- Blériot-SPAD S.72, a French biplane trainer
- Savoia-Marchetti S.72, an Italian transport monoplane
- Sikorsky S-72, an American experimental compound helicopter
- St. Maries Municipal Airport, in Benewah County, Idaho, United States

== Other uses ==
- HMCS Ojibwa (S72), a submarine of the Royal Canadian Navy
- S72, a postcode district for Barnsley, England
