= S77 =

S77 may refer to:

- S77, a rush-hour service of the Lucerne S-Bahn in Switzerland
- INS Dakar (S77), a submarine of the Israeli Navy
- Magee Airport, an airport in Idaho
