= S81 =

S81 may refer to:

== Aviation ==
- Blériot-SPAD S.81, a French fighter aircraft
- Indian Creek USFS Airport, in Valley County, Idaho, United States
- Short S.81, an experimental British biplane seaplane

== Other uses ==
- S81 (New York City bus) serving Staten Island
- County Route S81 (Bergen County, New Jersey)
- Daihatsu Hijet (S81), a kei truck and microvan
- Spanish submarine Isaac Peral (S-81), a S-80 Plus class submarine
- Stola S81 Stratos, a concept car
- S81, a line of the St. Gallen S-Bahn
- S81, a postcode district for Worksop, England
- BenQ-Siemens S81, a BenQ mobile phone
