= Cavanaugh Bay Airport =

Airport in Idaho, United States

- IATA: none; ICAO: none; FAA LID: 66S

Summary
- Airport type: Public
- Owner: State of Idaho - ITD Division of Aeronautics
- Serves: Coolin, Idaho
- Elevation AMSL: 2,484 ft (757 m)
- Coordinates: 48°31′07″N 116°49′20″W

Map
- Interactive map of Cavanaugh Bay Airport

Runways
Direction	Length		Surface
Direction	ft	m	Surface
15/33	3,100	945	Turf

Statistics (2006)
- Aircraft operations: 4,500
- Source: Federal Aviation Administration

Cavanaugh Bay Airport (FAA LID: 66S) is a public use airport located three nautical miles (6 km) north of the central business district of Coolin, in Bonner County, Idaho, United States. It is owned by the State of Idaho, Idaho Transportation Department, Division of Aeronautics. The airport is located on the east side of Priest Lake, at the south end of Cavanaugh Bay.

== Facilities and aircraft ==
Cavanaugh Bay Airport covers an area of 25 acres (10 ha) at an elevation of 2,484 feet (757 m) above mean sea level. It has one runway designated 15/33 with a 3,100 x 120 ft (945 x 37 m) turf surface. For the 12-month period ending June 7, 2006, the airport had 4,500 general aviation aircraft operations, an average of 375 per month.

== See also ==
- List of airports in Idaho
- Priest Lake USFS Airport
- Tanglefoot Seaplane Base
