= Boundary County Airport =

County-owned, public-use airport in Boundary County, Idaho, United States

- IATA: none; ICAO: none; FAA LID: 65S

Summary
- Airport type: Public
- Owner: Boundary County
- Location: Bonners Ferry, Idaho
- Elevation AMSL: 2,337 ft (712 m)
- Coordinates: 48°43′34″N 116°17′43″W
- Interactive map of Boundary County Airport

Runways
Direction	Length		Surface
Direction	ft	m	Surface
2/20	4,002	1,220	Asphalt

Statistics (2009)
- Aircraft operations: 18,825
- Based aircraft: 37
- Source: Federal Aviation Administration

Boundary County Airport (FAA LID: 65S) is a county-owned, public-use airport in Boundary County, Idaho, United States. It is located two nautical miles (3.7 km) northeast of the central business district of Bonners Ferry. According to the FAA's National Plan of Integrated Airport Systems for 2009–2013, it is categorized as a general aviation airport.

== Facilities and aircraft ==
Boundary County Airport covers an area of 183 acres (74 ha) at an elevation of 2,337 feet (712 m) above mean sea level. It has one runway designated 2/20 with an asphalt surface measuring 4,002 by 75 feet (1,220 x 23 m).

For the 12-month period ending July 30, 2009, the airport had 18,825 aircraft operations, an average of 51 per day: 97% general aviation, 3% air taxi, and <1% military. At that time there were 37 aircraft based at this airport: 94.6% single-engine, 2.7% multi-engine and 2.7% helicopter.

== In popular culture ==
On September 30, 2009 Colton Harris-Moore broke into and stole a Cessna 182 Turbo aircraft from Boundary County Airport, navigating over the high west ridge and westward through Washington state, over and across the Cascade Mountains and finally crash-landing outside of Granite Falls, Washington after failing an attempted landing at Green Valley Airport outside of town. Harris-Moore then made his escape on foot into the forest, eluding a federal dragnet involving helicopters, law enforcement personnel and dogs.

== See also ==
- List of airports in Idaho
