= Stibnite Mining District =

Region within the U.S. state of Idaho

- Stibnite Historic District
- U.S. National Register of Historic Places
- U.S. Historic district
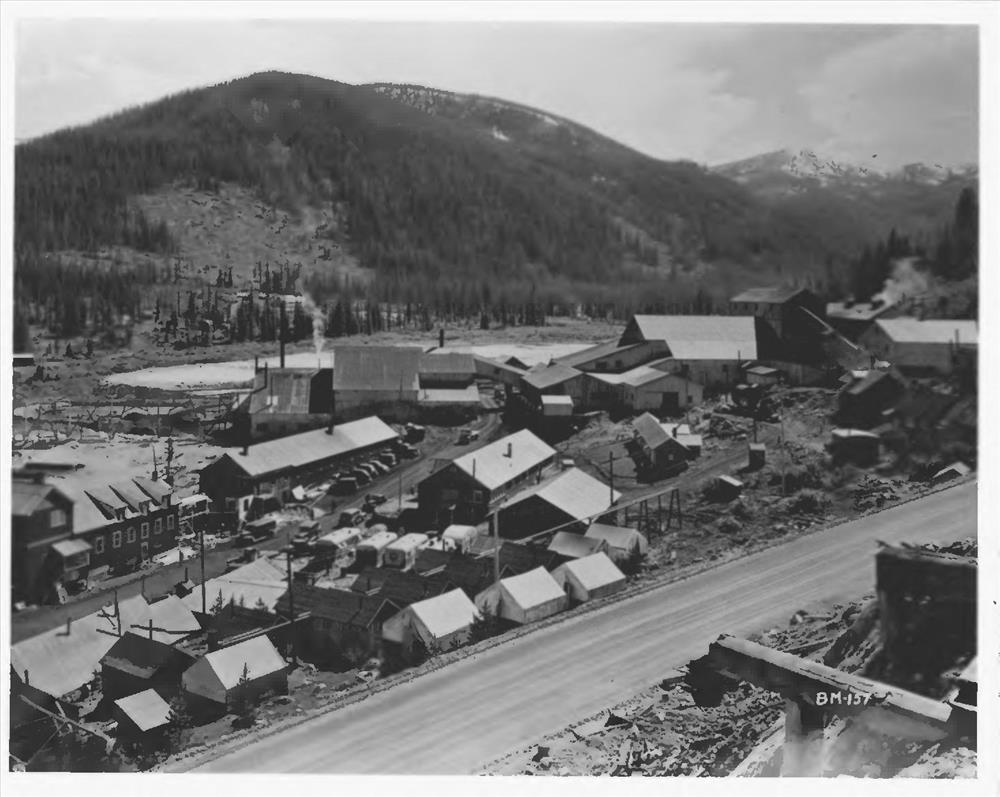
- Stibnite in 1942

- Location within Idaho Location within the United States
- Nearest city: Yellow Pine, Idaho
- Coordinates: 44.898°N 115.339°W
- Area: 2,828 acres (1,144 ha)
- NRHP reference No.: 87001186

Significant dates
- Period: 1925–1949
- Significant years: 1939, 1945
- Added to NRHP: July 19, 1987

The Stibnite Mining District, commonly referred to simply as Stibnite, is one of the most historic mining districts in the U.S. state of Idaho. It is located in the mountains of Valley County, Idaho, approximately 10 miles (16 km) outside of Yellow Pine and 39 miles (63 km) east of McCall. The site is rich with minerals, including gold, silver, antimony (found naturally within stibnite, for which the region is named) and tungsten. Over the last hundred years, it has been home to thousands of miners, operated by several different mining companies and was critical to the U.S. war effort in the 1940s and 1950s. Mining activity stopped in the late 1990s. Since 2009, a private company has conducted exploration in the area in consideration of new mining activity.

An area of 2,828 acres (1,144 ha) within the Payette National Forest was added to the National Register of Historic Places on July 19, 1987, as the Stibnite Historic District.

== History ==
Miners first came to Stibnite during Idaho’s gold rush days in 1899. Over the next few years, the number of miners at the site continued to grow and several operators, including United Mercury Mining Company and Bradley Mining Company, started working in the area.

In 1938, miners started focusing their efforts on the Yellow Pine Pit. Miners were able to extract large quantities of gold from this area of the site. However, operations at the pit blocked fish passage and to this day fish in the East Fork of the South Fork of the Salmon River cannot swim upstream past the site.

During World War II, antimony became a mineral that was critical to the war effort. It was used to create bullets. Stibnite contained such large quantities of antimony that individuals were able to serve their country by working at the site. At one point, more than 1,500 people were working at the site. From 1941 to 1945, Stibnite mined and milled more tungsten and antimony than any other mine in the United States. During this wartime period Stibnite produced 40 percent of the nation's domestic supply of tungsten and 90 percent of its antimony.

After World War II, operations at the site slowed down and many miners moved out of the area. Mining continued in the area sporadically from the 1970s through 1997.

In 2009, a Canadian company known as Midas Gold began test drilling on private land within the district, evaluating it for future mining potential. As of early 2021, the company—renamed as Perpetua Resources and relocated to Boise—was preparing to reopen a gold mine in the area; the plan was met with criticism from the Idaho Conservation League and a lawsuit from the Nez Perce Tribe of Idaho.

== Geology ==
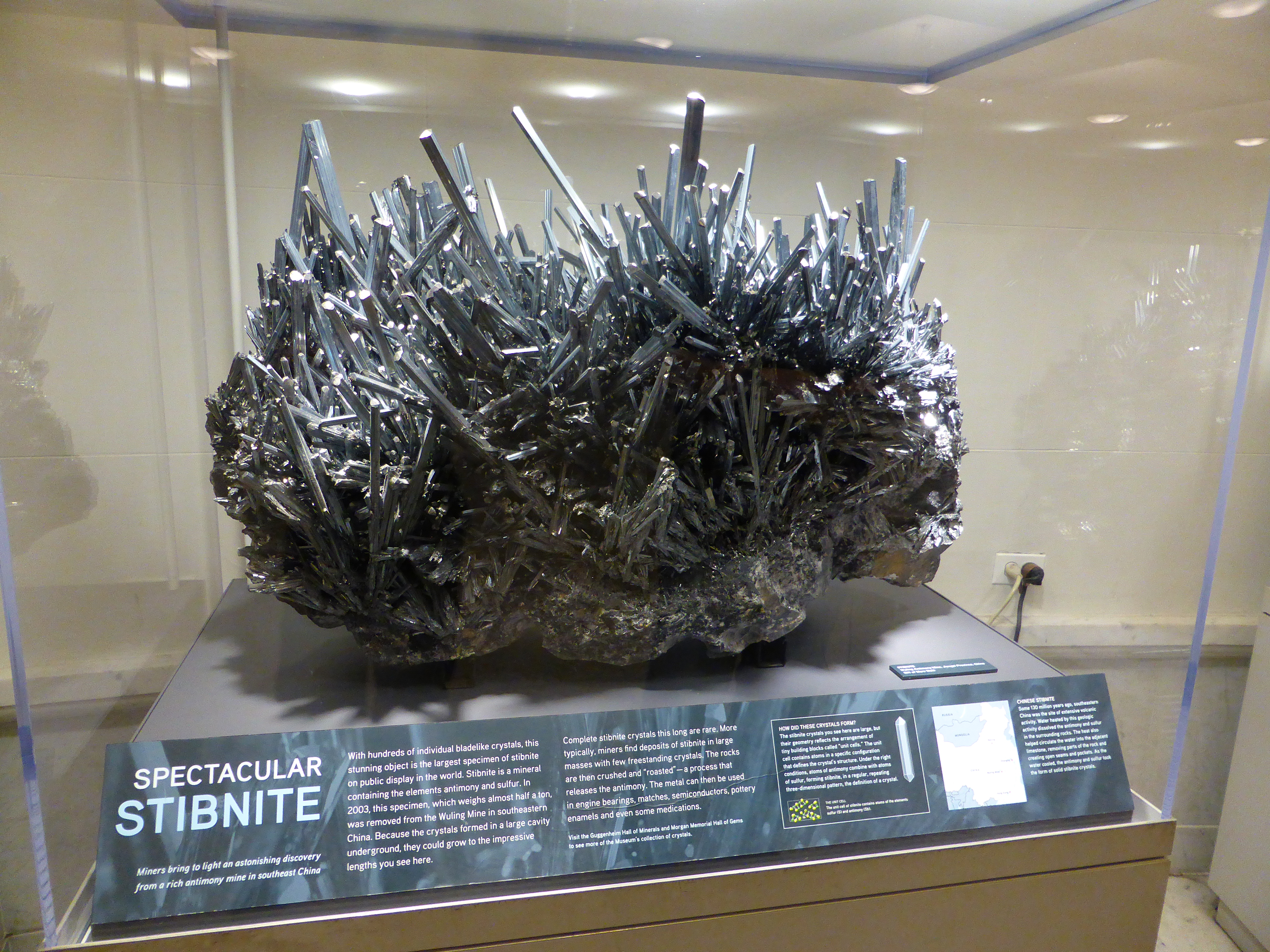
A specimen of stibnite

The Stibnite Mining District sits atop the Idaho Batholith, one of the signature features of Idaho’s unique geology. The Idaho Batholith is nearly 14,000 square miles (36,000 km^{2}) of granite, formed from the collision of the oceanic plate and the North American Plate around 100 million years ago during the Cretaceous period. Continental drift pushed the denser oceanic plate under the North American Plate, where immense heat, pressure and superheated water caused the rocks to melt, rise and then slowly cool, creating the vast expanse of crystalline granite underneath most of central Idaho.

Some 50 million years later, an enormous volcanic complex erupted through the granite and left behind volcanic ash, lavas and crystalline rocks. The volcanic activity pumped hot fluids into the cracks and pores of the Idaho Batholith. These hot fluids contained gold, silver, antimony and sulfur which, as the waters cooled, left behind minerals like pyrite, stibnite and scheelite. The partnership of the Idaho Batholith cooling and interacting with volcanic forces, and mineral-rich fluids, created a geologic region that has captured the attention and imagination of geologists and prospectors for more than 100 years.
