= Rexburg–Madison County Airport =

Airport in Idaho, United States

- IATA: RXE; ICAO: KRXE; FAA LID: RXE

Summary
- Airport type: Public
- Owner: City of Rexburg & Madison County
- Serves: Rexburg, Idaho
- Elevation AMSL: 4,862 ft (1,482 m)
- Coordinates: 43°50′02″N 111°48′18″W

Map
- Location of airport in Idaho

Runways
Direction	Length		Surface
Direction	ft	m	Surface
17/35	4,204	1,281	Asphalt

Statistics (2012)
- Aircraft operations: 31,150
- Based aircraft: 68
- Source: Federal Aviation Administration

Rexburg–Madison County Airport (IATA: RXE, ICAO: KRXE, FAA LID: RXE) is a public use airport located in Rexburg, a city in Madison County, Idaho, United States, 1 nautical mile (1.9 km) northwest of the central business district of that city. It is owned by the City of Rexburg and Madison County. This airport is included in the National Plan of Integrated Airport Systems for 2011–2015, which categorized it as a general aviation facility.

== Facilities and aircraft ==
Rexburg–Madison County Airport covers an area of 144 acres (58 ha) at an elevation of 4,862 feet (1,482 m) above mean sea level. It has one runway designated 17/35 with an asphalt surface measuring 4,204 by 75 feet (1,281 x 23 m).

For the 12-month period ending September 21, 2012, the airport had 31,150 aircraft operations, an average of 85 per day: 97.9% general aviation, 1.9% air taxi, and 0.2% military. At that time there were 68 aircraft based at this airport: 86.8% single-engine, 4.4% multi-engine, 4.4% helicopter, and 4.4% ultralight.

== See also ==
- List of airports in Idaho
