= Chamberlain USFS Airport =

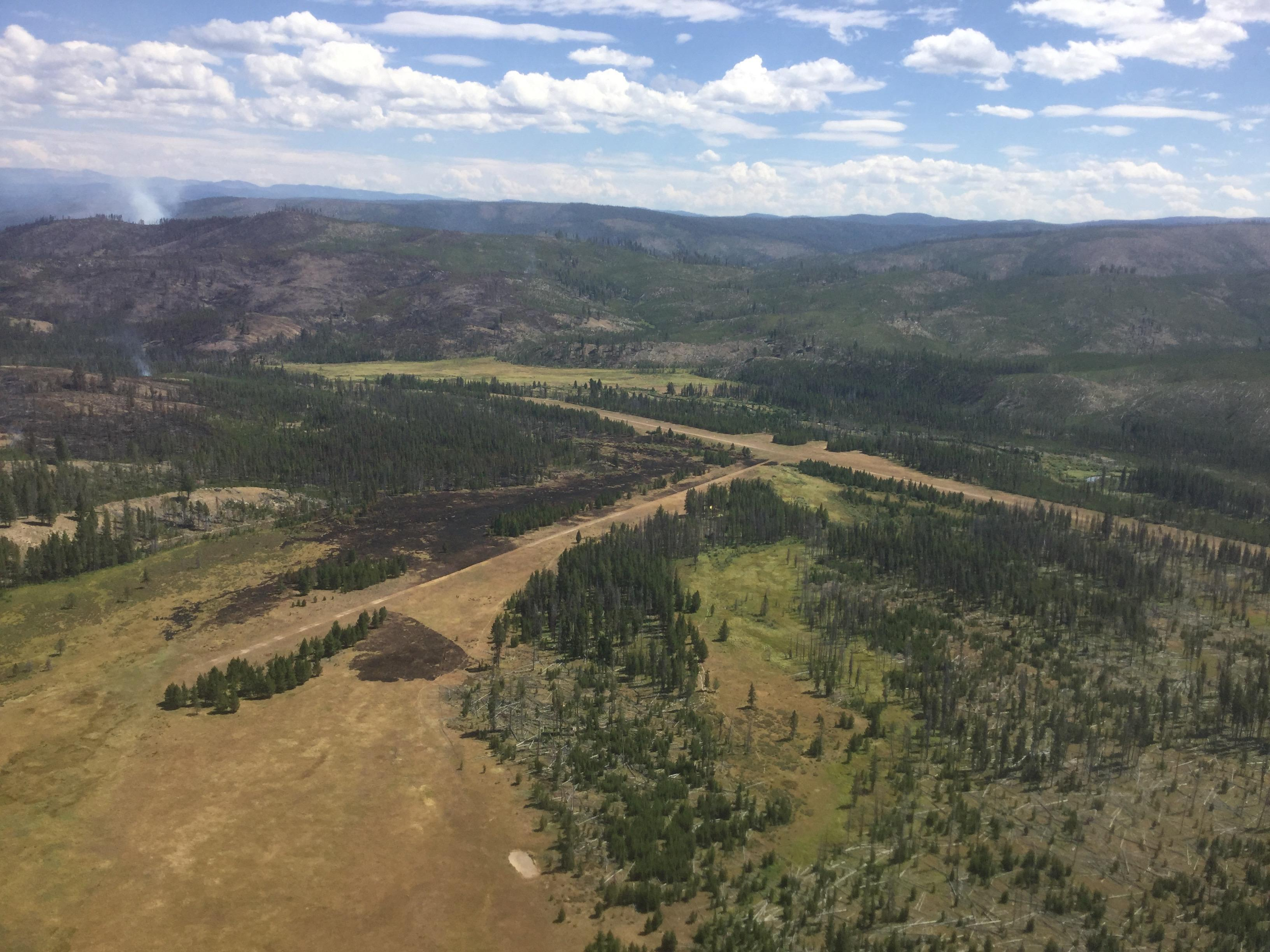
- IATA: none; ICAO: none; FAA LID: U79

Summary
- Airport type: Public
- Owner: U.S. Forest Service
- Serves: Chamberlain Guard Station, Idaho
- Elevation AMSL: 5,765 ft (1,757 m)
- Coordinates: 45°22′45″N 115°11′48″W

Map
- Location within Idaho

Runways
Direction	Length		Surface
Direction	ft	m	Surface
7/25	4,100	1,250	Turf/dirt
15/33	2,700	823	Turf

Statistics (2009)
- Aircraft operations: 4,000
- Source: Federal Aviation Administration

Chamberlain USFS Airport (FAA LID: U79) is a public use airport located at Chamberlain Guard Station, in Idaho County, Idaho, United States. The airport is owned by the U.S. Forest Service. It is located near Chamberlain Creek in the Payette National Forest.

== Facilities and aircraft ==
Chamberlain USFS Airport covers an area of 55 acres (22 ha) at an elevation of 5,765 feet (1,757 m) above mean sea level. It has two runways: 7/25 is 4,100 by 200 feet (1,250 x 61 m) with a turf and dirt surface and 15/33 is 2,700 by 140 feet (823 x 43 m) with a turf surface. For the 12-month period ending September 24, 2009, the airport had 4,000 aircraft operations, an average of 10 per day: 62.5% general aviation and 37.5% air taxi.

== See also ==
- List of airports in Idaho
- List of airports in the United States
