= Johnson Creek Airport =

Coordinates: 44°54′44″N 115°29′08″W

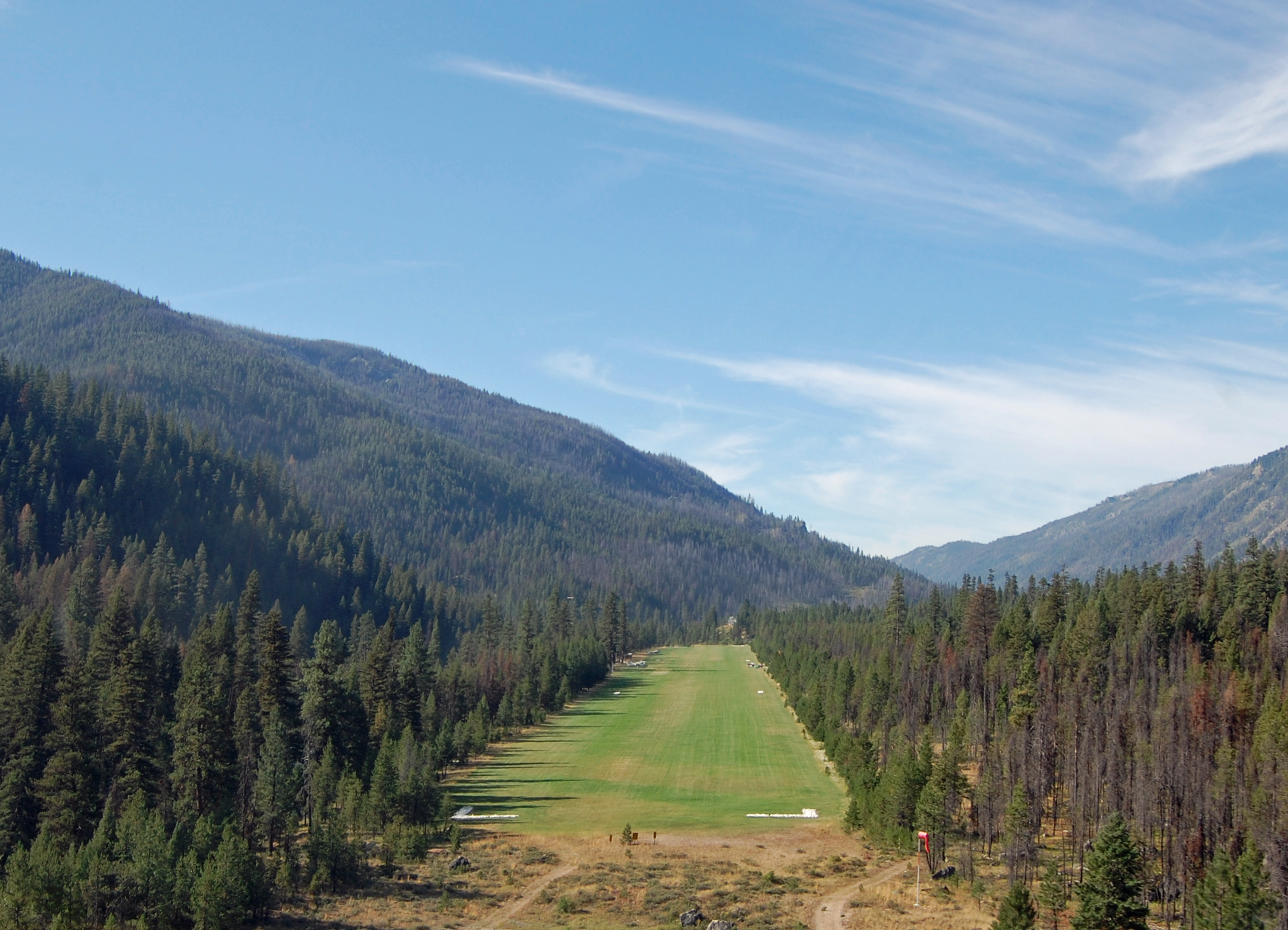
- Johnson Creek Airport as seen on approach to runway 17.
- IATA: none; ICAO: none; FAA LID: 3U2

Summary
- Airport type: Public
- Owner: Idaho Transportation Department, Division of Aeronautics
- Serves: Yellow Pine, Idaho
- Elevation AMSL: 4,960 ft (1,510 m)

Map
- Interactive map of Johnson Creek Airport

Runways
Direction	Length		Surface
Direction	ft	m	Surface
17/35	3,400	1,036	Turf

Statistics (2023)
- Aircraft operations (year ending 6/30/2023): 5,750
- Source: Federal Aviation Administration

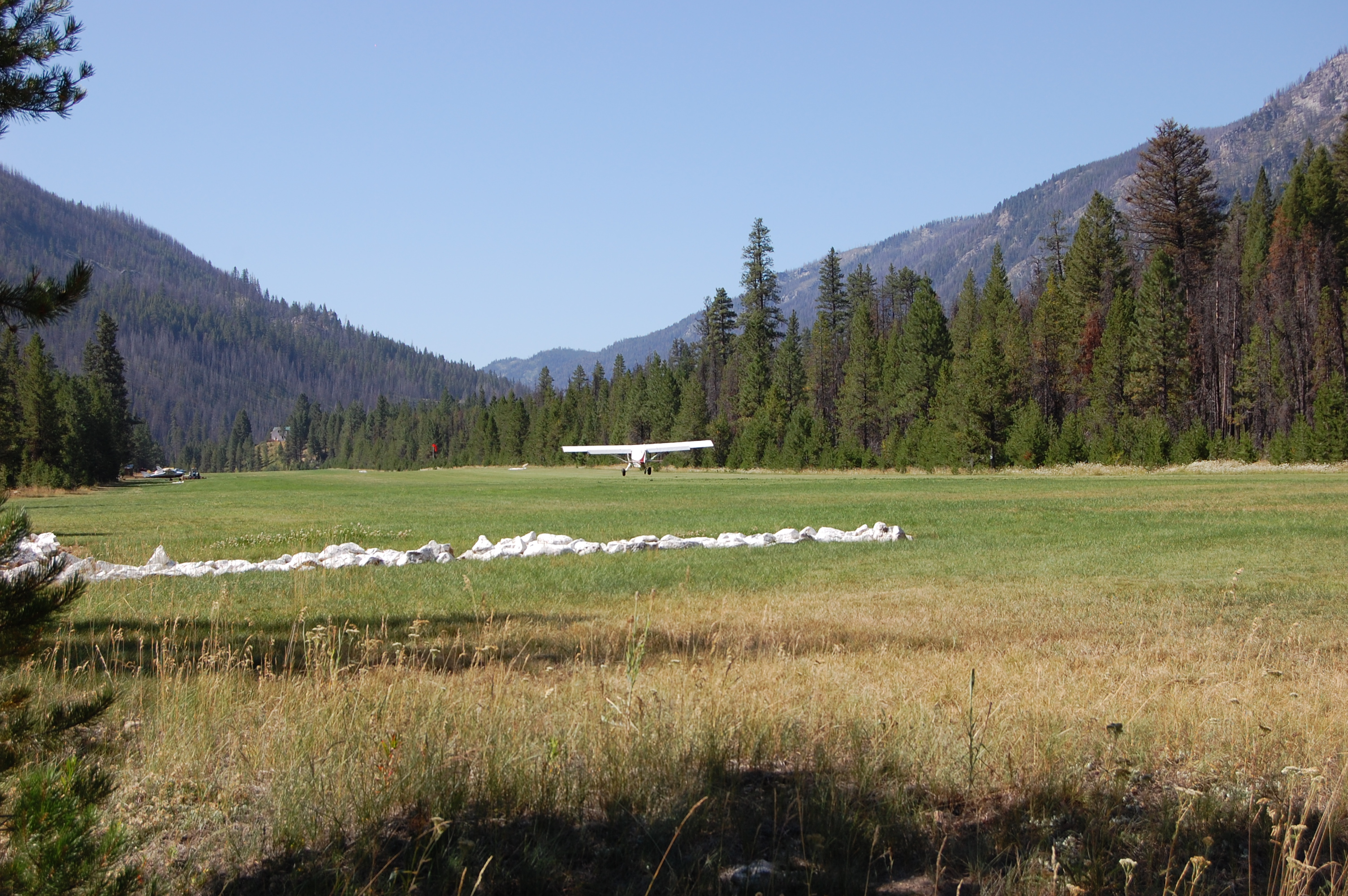
A Maule M-6 landing on runway 17

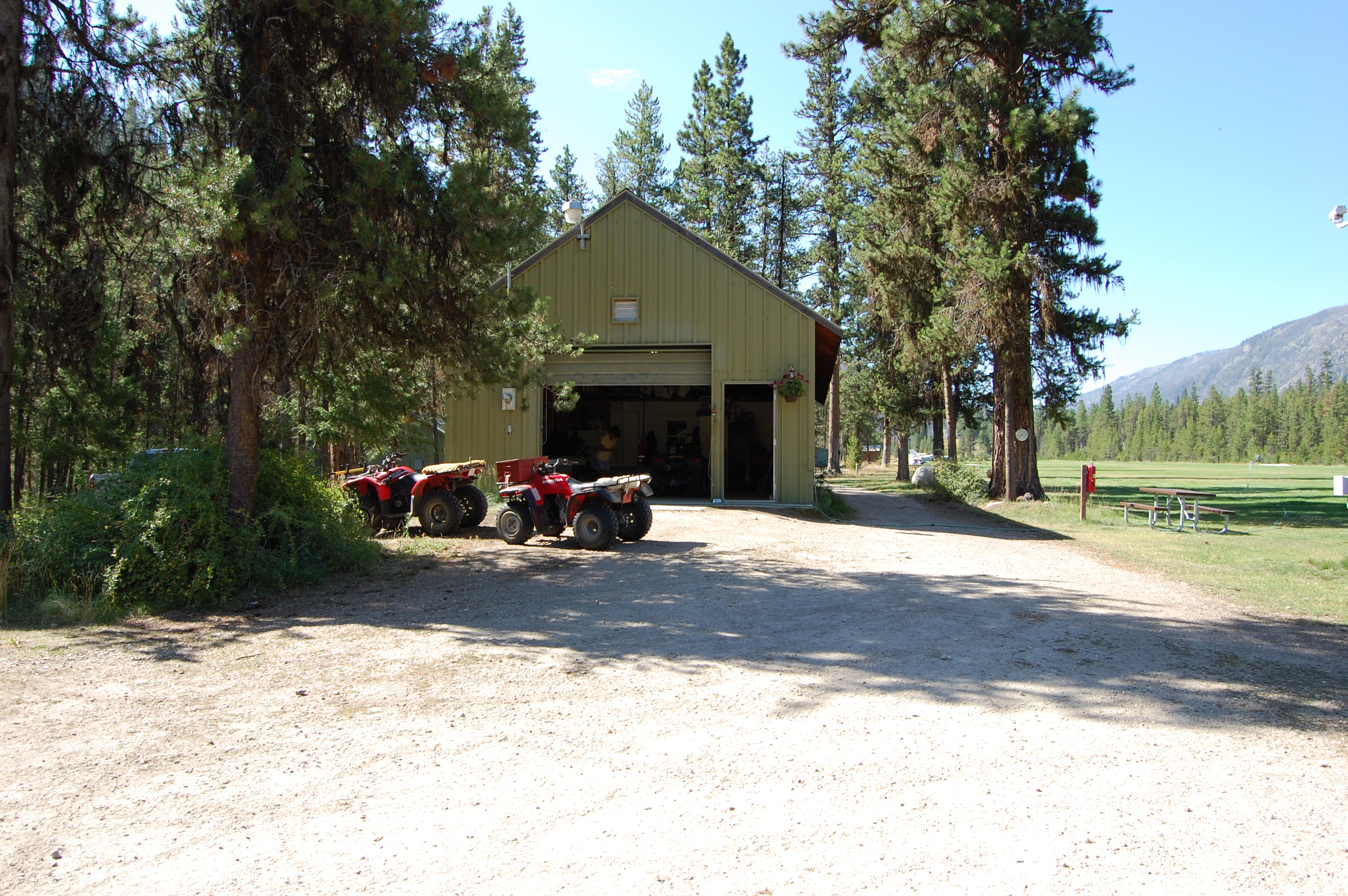
The caretaker's quarters at the airport

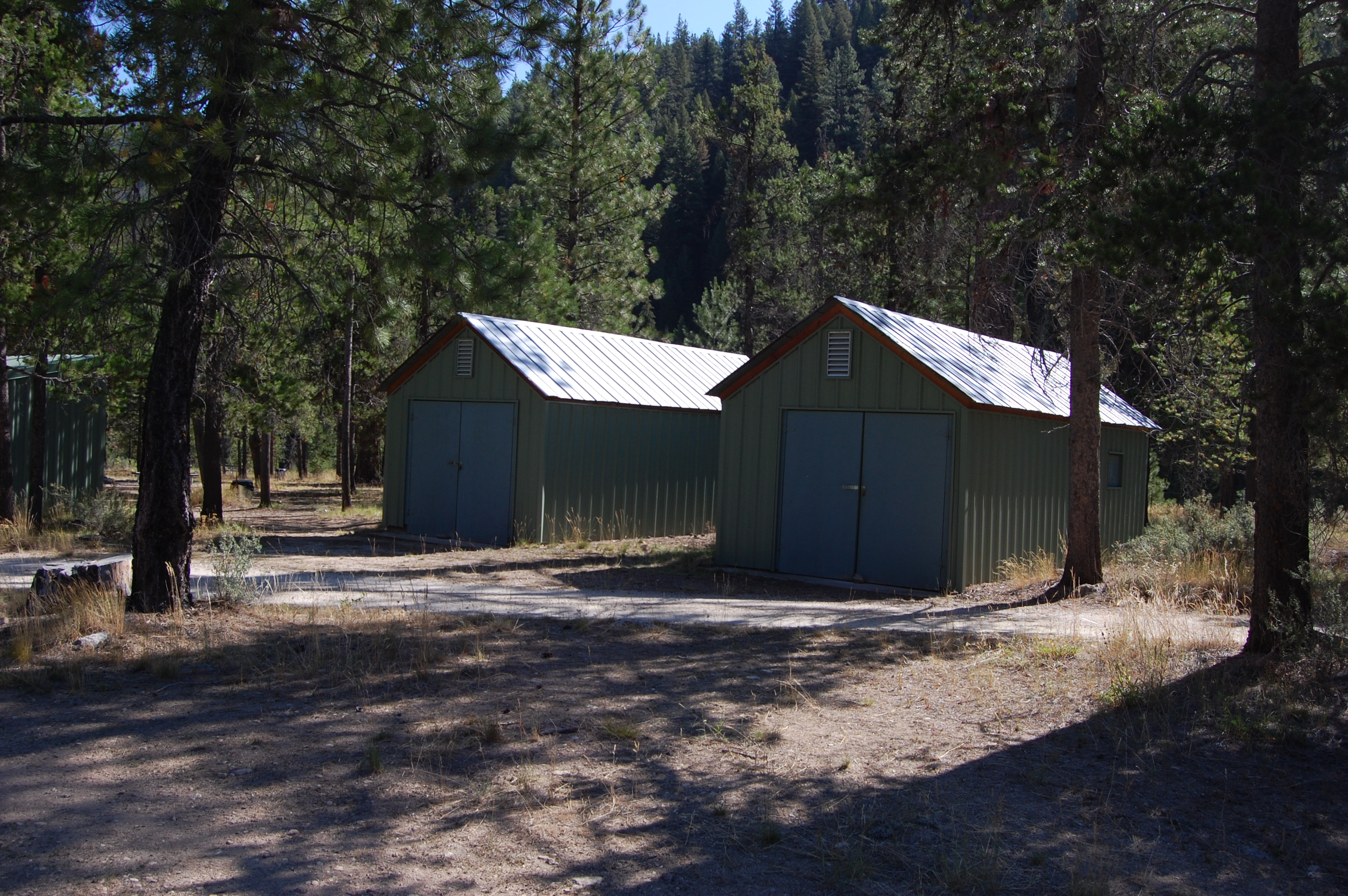
Bunk houses are part of the free camping accommodations at the airport

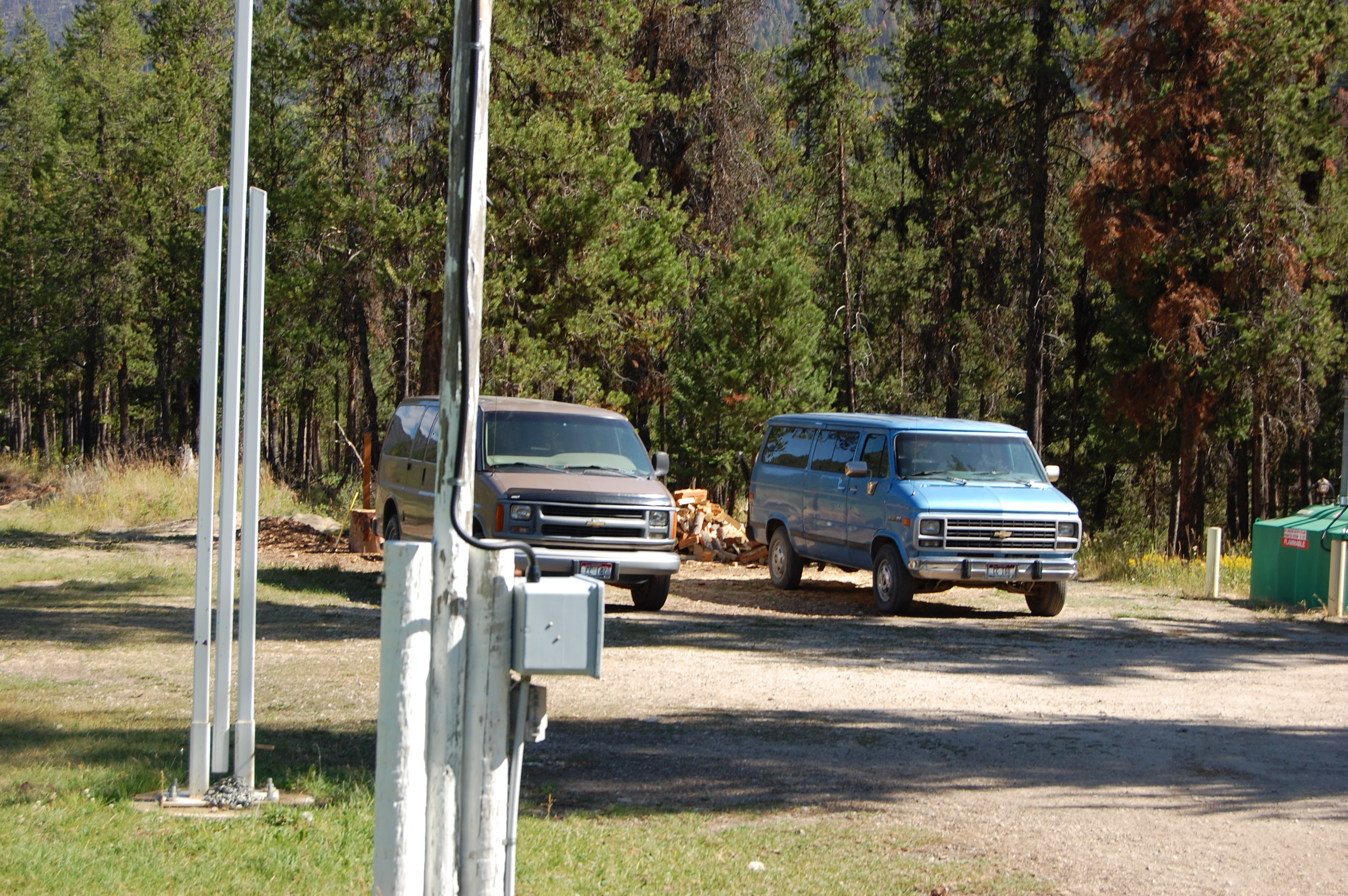
Courtesy cars are available for a small fee at the airport

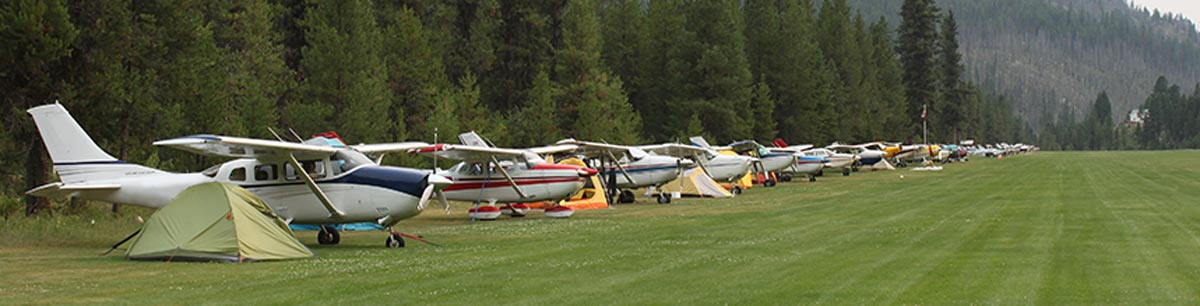
Pilots camping at Johnson Creek Airfield, ID

Johnson Creek Airport (FAA LID: 3U2) is a grass airstrip in Central Idaho three miles (4.8 km) south of Yellow Pine, a village in Valley County, Idaho, United States. It is managed by the Idaho Division of Aeronautics of the Idaho Transportation Department. A caretaker resides at the field and the turf runway is well cared for. Johnson Creek is a backcountry airstrip and is popular with pilots who enjoy airplane camping.

== Facilities ==
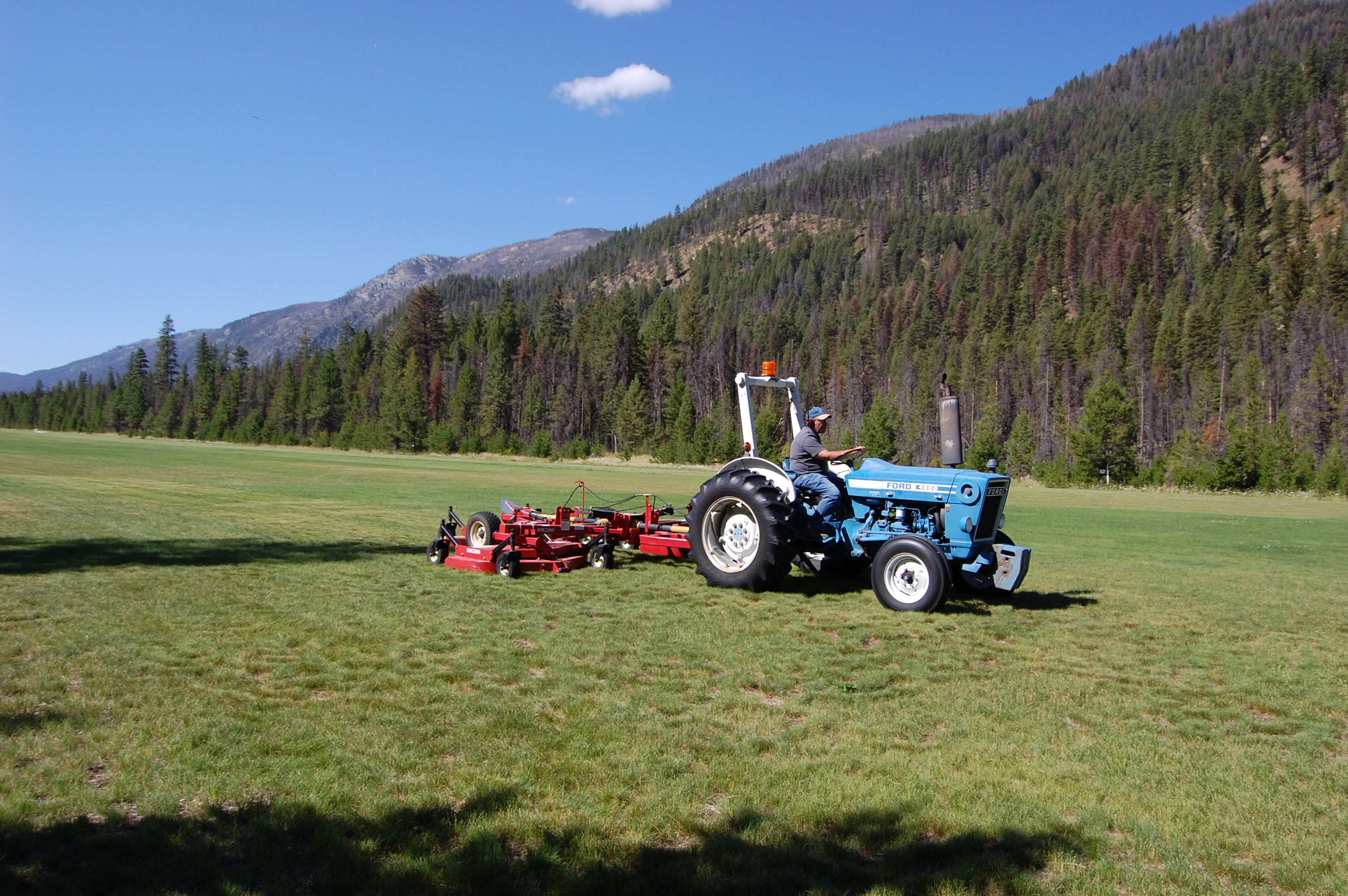
The lawn mower keeps the grass at an even length

Johnson Creek Airport covers an area of 40 acres (16 ha) which contains one grass runway (17/35) which is 3,400 feet (1,000 m) long and 150 feet (46 m) wide. The field elevation is 4,960 feet (1,510 m) above sea level.

For the 12-month period ending June 30, 2023, the airport had 5,750 aircraft operations, an average of 15 per day: 87% general aviation and 13% air taxi.

Also on the airport is a campground for fly-in campers, along with complimentary hot showers, a bunk house, pit toilets, and two courtesy rental cars. The airport has a small shelter with a freezer, a telephone, map of the area, bench, and a small sign-in book that logs all the arrivals and departures. The caretaker frequently mows and waters the grass of the runway and parking areas, provides freshly chopped firewood for campers, and maintains the campground and courtesy cars.

== Accidents and incidents ==
- On August 15, 2022, an Aviat A-1A Husky two-seat light aircraft crashed about 265 feet northeast of the departure end of runway 35. Both occupants (twin brothers) were fatally injured.
- On August 29, 2024, a Cessna T206H six-seat light aircraft crashed and was destroyed by fire southeast of the departure end of runway 17 during a go-around, after bouncing multiple times on the runway while attempting to land. Both occupants were fatally injured.

== See also ==
- List of airports in Idaho
