= Priest Lake USFS Airport =

- IATA: none; ICAO: none; FAA LID: 67S

Summary
- Airport type: Public
- Owner: U.S. Forest Service
- Serves: Nordman, Idaho
- Elevation AMSL: 2,611 ft / 796 m
- Coordinates: 48°34′30″N 116°57′49″W

Map
- Interactive map of Priest Lake USFS Airport

Runways
Direction	Length		Surface
Direction	ft	m	Surface
14/32	4,400	1,341	Turf/gravel

Statistics (2007)
- Aircraft operations: 1,200
- Source: Federal Aviation Administration

Priest Lake USFS Airport (FAA LID: 67S) is a public use airport located three nautical miles (6 km) south of the central business district of Nordman, in Bonner County, Idaho, United States. It is owned by the United States Forest Service. The airport is located at the west side of Priest Lake.

== Facilities and aircraft ==
Priest Lake USFS Airport covers an area of 40 acres (16 ha) at an elevation of 2,611 feet (796 m) above mean sea level. It has one runway designated 14/32 with a 4,400 x 175 ft (1,341 x 53 m) turf and gravel surface.

For the 12-month period ending May 23, 2007, the airport had 1,200 general aviation aircraft operations, and average of 100 per month.

== See also ==
- Cavanaugh Bay Airport
- List of airports in Idaho
- Tanglefoot Seaplane Base
