= Sandpoint Airport =

Airport in Idaho, United States

Sandpoint Airport Dave Wall Field
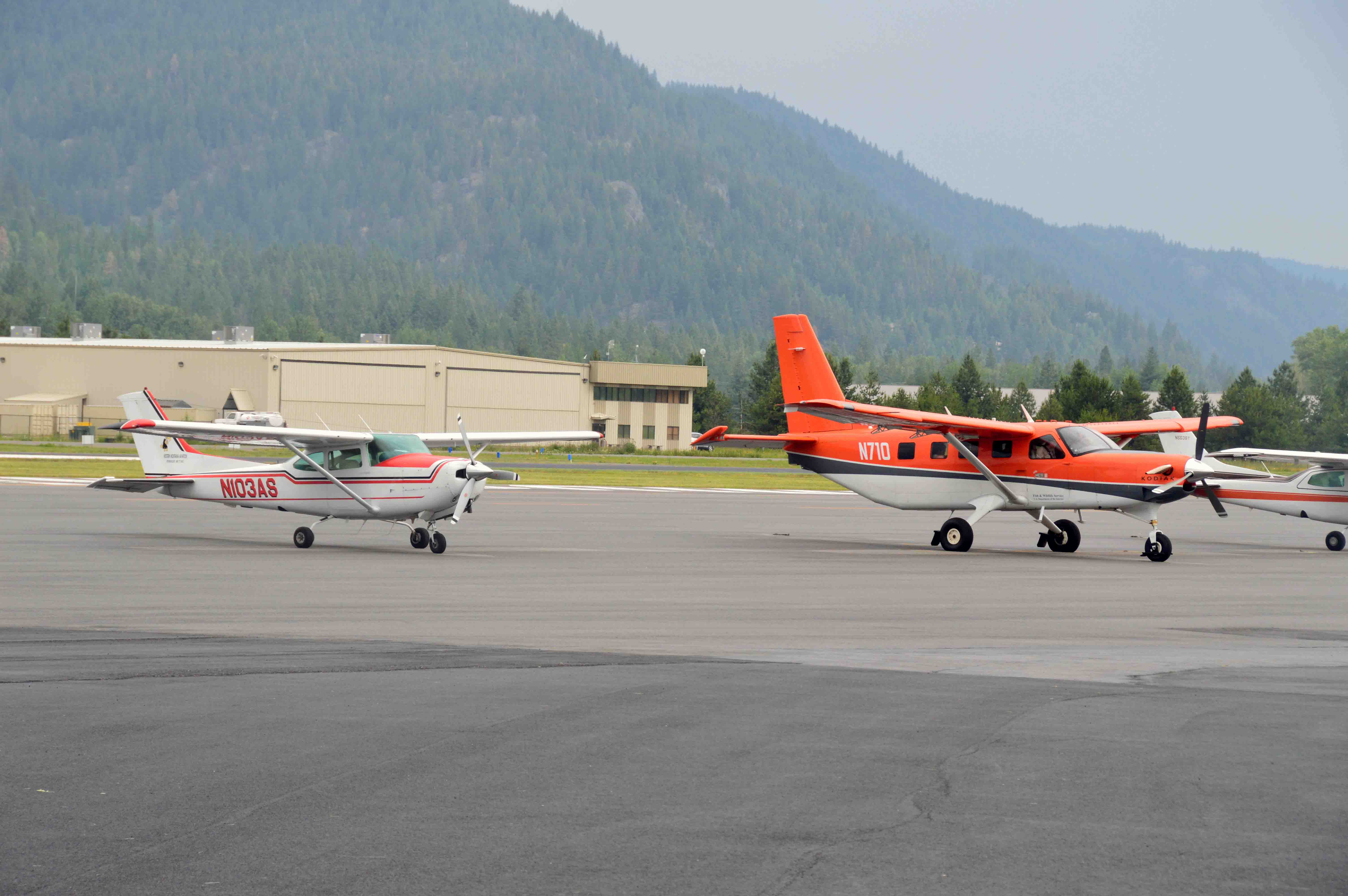
- IATA: none; ICAO: KSZT; FAA LID: SZT

Summary
- Airport type: Public
- Owner: Bonner County
- Serves: Sandpoint, Idaho
- Elevation AMSL: 2,131 ft (650 m)
- Coordinates: 48°17′58″N 116°33′36″W

Map
- Location within Idaho Location within the United States

Runways
Direction	Length		Surface
Direction	ft	m	Surface
2/20	5,501	1,677	Asphalt

Statistics (2006)
- Aircraft operations: 29,900
- Based aircraft: 85
- Source: Federal Aviation Administration

Sandpoint Airport (ICAO: KSZT, FAA LID: SZT) is a county-owned public-use airport in the northwest United States, located two nautical miles (4 km) north of the central business district of Sandpoint in Bonner County, Idaho. The airport is also known as Dave Wall Field.

Although most U.S. airports use the same three-letter location identifier for the FAA and IATA, this airport is assigned SZT by the FAA but has no designation from the IATA (which assigned SZT to San Cristóbal de las Casas National Airport in Mexico).

== Facilities and aircraft ==
Sandpoint Airport covers an area of 104 acres (42 ha) at an elevation of 2,131 feet (650 m) above mean sea level. It has one asphalt paved runway designated 2/20 which measures 5,501 by 75 feet (1,677 by 23 m).

For the 12-month period ending April 28, 2006, the airport had 29,900 aircraft operations, an average of 81 per day: 99% general aviation and 1% air taxi. At that time there were 85 aircraft based at this airport: 84% single-engine, 13% multi-engine, 2% helicopter and 1% jet.

== See also ==
- List of airports in Idaho
