= Tanglefoot Seaplane Base =

- IATA: none; ICAO: none; FAA LID: D28

Summary
- Airport type: Public
- Owner: Tanglefoot Ltd.
- Serves: Cavanaugh Bay, Idaho
- Elevation AMSL: 2,438 ft (743 m)
- Coordinates: 48°32′20″N 116°49′56″W

Map
- Interactive map of Tanglefoot Seaplane Base

Runways
Direction	Length		Surface
Direction	ft	m	Surface
15/33	10,000	3,048	Water

Statistics (2007)
- Aircraft operations: 175
- Source: Federal Aviation Administration

Tanglefoot Seaplane Base (FAA LID: D28) is a privately owned, public-use seaplane base in Bonner County, Idaho, United States. It is located at Priest Lake, on the west shore of Cavanaugh Bay.

== Facilities and aircraft ==
Tanglefoot Seaplane Base covers an area of 15 acres (6.1 ha) at an elevation of 2,438 feet (743 m) above mean sea level. It has one landing area (15/33) measuring 10,000 x 2,000 feet (3,048 x 610 m). For the 12-month period ending May 21, 2007, the airport had 175 general aviation aircraft operations.

== See also ==
- Cavanaugh Bay Airport
- List of airports in Idaho
- Priest Lake USFS Airport
