= Valley County, Idaho =

County in Idaho, United States

- County
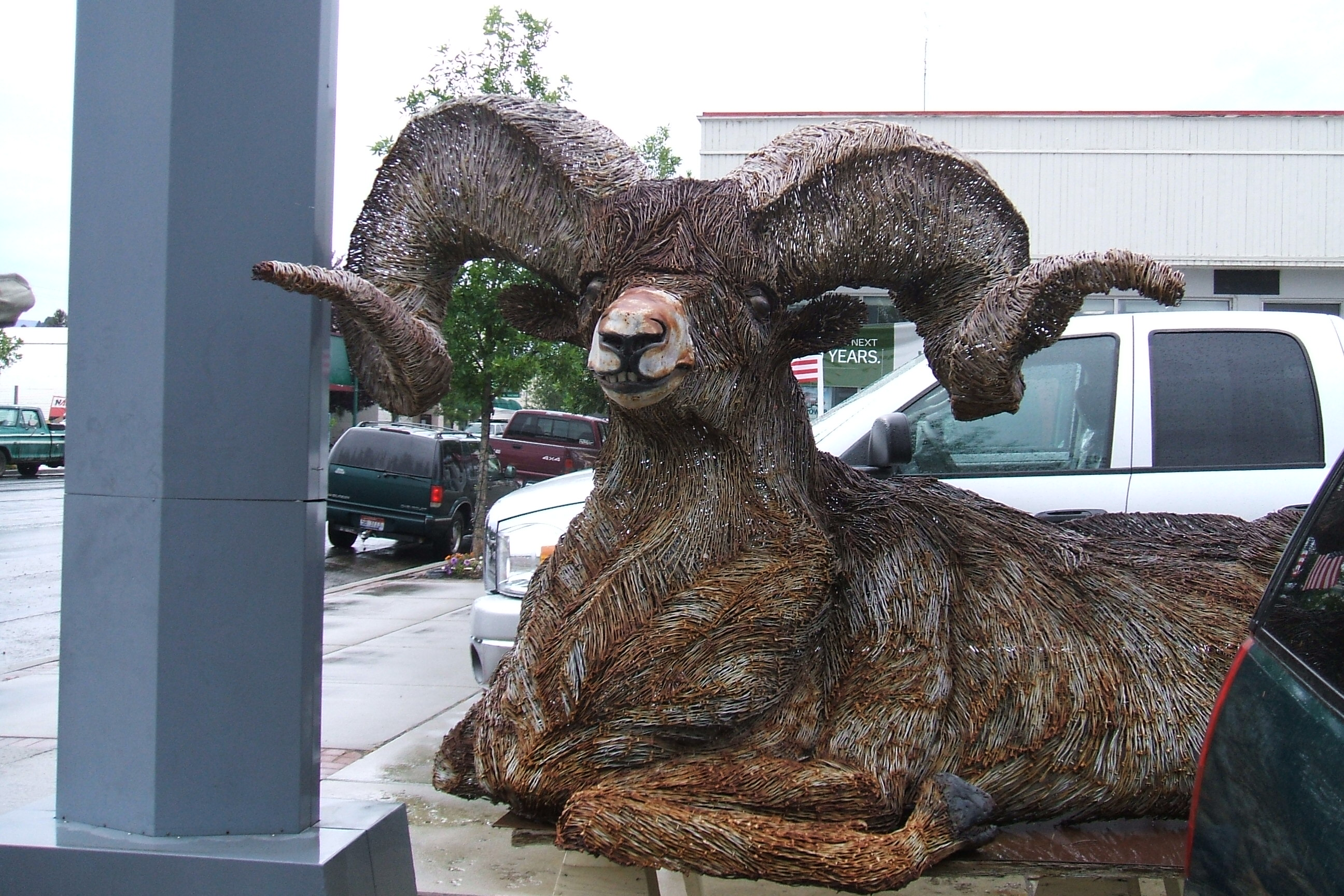
- Bighorn Ram, Recycled Barbed Wire Sculpture in Cascade, Idaho

- Seal

- Location within the U.S. state of Idaho
- Coordinates: 44°44′N 115°34′W
- Country: United States
- State: Idaho
- Founded: February 26, 1917
- Named for: The Long Valley of the North Fork of the Payette River
- Seat: Cascade
- Largest city: McCall

Area
  - Total: 3,733 sq mi (9,670 km^{2})
  - Land: 3,665 sq mi (9,490 km^{2})
  - Water: 68 sq mi (180 km^{2}) 1.8%

Population (2020)
  - Total: 11,746
  - Estimate (2025): 12,831 ▲
  - Density: 3.1/sq mi (1.2/km^{2})
- Time zone: UTC−7 (Mountain)
  - Summer (DST): UTC−6 (MDT)
- Congressional district: 1st
- Website: www.valleycountyid.gov

Valley County is a rural county located in the U.S. state of Idaho. As of the 2020 census, the population was 11,746. The county seat is Cascade, and the largest city is McCall. Established in 1917, it was named after the Long Valley of the North Fork of the Payette River, which extends over 30 miles (50 km) from Payette Lake at McCall south to Cascade to Round Valley. The valley was formerly a summer pasture for livestock from the Boise Valley. Since the completion of the Cascade Dam in 1948, much of the northern valley has been covered by the Cascade Reservoir.

Valley County is home to the Idaho ground squirrel.

== History ==
Packer John Welch, who had contracted to freight supplies to miners of Idaho City, established a camp on Gold Fork Creek and a brush cabin on Clear Creek in the 1860s. He also established a station near what later became the town of Cascade.

During the 1870s, prospectors and miners started searching for gold. The Clara Foltz mines opened on Paddy Flat, and other diggings commenced on Boulder and Gold Fork Creeks. In the late 1870s, the last of the Sheepeater Tribe was removed from Long Valley and Round Valley to a reservation. As the gold sources dwindled, a few of the miners took up squatter's rights. James Horner built a cabin on Clear Creek in 1881, other miners settled on the Payette River.

Also in 1888, the first post offices in Valley County were opened at VanWyck, another one opened at Lardo in 1889. That same year Louis McCall and other settlers took squatter's rights on Payette Lake. Their homesteads were the nucleus of what would later become the town of McCall. A freight stop was established at Lardo to service the increased mining activity at Warren Meadows.

The 1890 census stated 538 people resided in the VanWyck precinct, and 110 resided in the Alpha precinct. Land survey maps drawn in the 1890s show four schools. The maps also point out sawmills at Warner's Pond and on Gold Fork Creek. A small reservoir near VanWyck can also be seen on them. The 1890s were a period of strife for the new settlers. Ranchers from south of Long Valley annually brought their large herds of cattle to graze in Long Valley. The homesteaders resented the intrusion and retaliated on several occasions by slaughtering the outsiders' cattle.

Gold was first discovered in the Thunder Mountain area in 1893, W.H. Dewey began mining on a large scale in 1902. As many as 3,000 miners swarmed into the region.

From the 1910s onwards, logging became, along with farming and ranching, the economic mainstay of Long Valley. Towns distant from the railroad, such as Alpha, Crawford and Roseberry, soon lost their vitality and died. Towns near the railroad, such as Cascade, Donnelly and McCall, thrived and became the population centers of Valley County.

The Stibnite Mining District, located near Yellow Pine, was critical to the country's war effort during World War II.

== Geography ==
According to the U.S. Census Bureau, the county has a total area of 3,733 square miles (9,670 km^{2}), of which 3,665 square miles (9,490 km^{2}) is land and 68 square miles (180 km^{2}) (1.8%) is water. It is the fifth-largest county in Idaho by area.

=== Adjacent counties ===
- Idaho County - north
- Adams County - west
- Gem County - southwest
- Boise County - south
- Custer County - east
- Lemhi County - east

=== National protected areas ===
- Boise National Forest (part)
- Payette National Forest (part)
- Salmon-Challis National Forest (part)

== Demographics ==
Historical population
Census	Pop.	Note	%±
1920	2,524		—
1930	3,488		38.2%
1940	4,035		15.7%
1950	4,270		5.8%
1960	3,663		−14.2%
1970	3,609		−1.5%
1980	5,604		55.3%
1990	6,109		9.0%
2000	7,651		25.2%
2010	9,862		28.9%
2020	11,746		19.1%
2025 (est.)	12,831	▲	9.2%
U.S. Decennial Census; 1790–1960, 1900–1990, 1990–2000, 2010–2020 2020

=== Racial and ethnic composition ===
Valley County, Idaho – Racial and ethnic composition Note: the US Census treats Hispanic/Latino as an ethnic category. This table excludes Latinos from the racial categories and assigns them to a separate category. Hispanics/Latinos may be of any race.
Race / Ethnicity (NH = Non-Hispanic)	Pop 1980	Pop 1990	Pop 2000	Pop 2010	Pop 2020	% 1980	% 1990	% 2000	% 2010	% 2020
White alone (NH)	5,457	5,911	7,328	9,277	10,467	97.38%	96.76%	95.78%	94.07%	89.11%
Black or African American alone (NH)	6	7	2	9	16	0.11%	0.11%	0.03%	0.09%	0.14%
Native American or Alaska Native alone (NH)	25	59	46	38	54	0.45%	0.97%	0.60%	0.39%	0.46%
Asian alone (NH)	26	25	22	41	55	0.46%	0.41%	0.29%	0.42%	0.47%
Native Hawaiian or Pacific Islander alone (NH)	x	x	3	1	8	x	x	0.04%	0.01%	0.07%
Other race alone (NH)	5	0	10	4	78	0.09%	0.00%	0.13%	0.04%	0.66%
Mixed race or Multiracial (NH)	x	x	90	106	467	x	x	1.18%	1.07%	3.98%
Hispanic or Latino (any race)	85	107	150	386	601	1.52%	1.75%	1.96%	3.91%	5.12%
Total	5,604	6,109	7,651	9,862	11,746	100.00%	100.00%	100.00%	100.00%	100.00%

=== 2020 census ===
As of the 2020 census, the county had a population of 11,746. The median age was 49.5 years. 18.6% of residents were under the age of 18 and 26.4% of residents were 65 years of age or older. For every 100 females there were 103.6 males, and for every 100 females age 18 and over there were 104.8 males.

The racial makeup of the county was 90.2% White, 0.1% Black or African American, 0.6% American Indian and Alaska Native, 0.5% Asian, 0.1% Native Hawaiian and Pacific Islander, 2.6% from some other race, and 5.8% from two or more races. Hispanic or Latino residents of any race comprised 5.1% of the population.

31.5% of residents lived in urban areas, while 68.5% lived in rural areas.

There were 5,131 households in the county, of which 22.5% had children under the age of 18 living with them and 18.9% had a female householder with no spouse or partner present. About 28.3% of all households were made up of individuals and 13.4% had someone living alone who was 65 years of age or older.

There were 12,189 housing units, of which 57.9% were vacant. Among occupied housing units, 77.2% were owner-occupied and 22.8% were renter-occupied. The homeowner vacancy rate was 2.1% and the rental vacancy rate was 9.5%.

=== 2010 census ===
As of the 2010 United States census, there were 9,862 people, 4,393 households, and 2,870 families living in the county. The population density was 2.7 inhabitants per square mile (1.0/km^{2}). There were 11,789 housing units at an average density of 3.2 units per square mile (1.2 units/km^{2}). The racial makeup of the county was 95.8% white, 0.7% American Indian, 0.4% Asian, 0.1% black or African American, 1.6% from other races, and 1.4% from two or more races. Those of Hispanic or Latino origin made up 3.9% of the population. In terms of ancestry, 33.9% were German, 19.3% were English, 12.8% were Irish, 7.6% were American, and 5.5% were Scottish.

Of the 4,393 households, 24.1% had children under the age of 18 living with them, 55.8% were married couples living together, 6.0% had a female householder with no husband present, 34.7% were non-families, and 27.9% of all households were made up of individuals. The average household size was 2.23 and the average family size was 2.71. The median age was 46.9 years.

The median income for a household in the county was $50,851 and the median income for a family was $59,737. Males had a median income of $40,917 versus $35,876 for females. The per capita income for the county was $27,577. About 11.5% of families and 15.4% of the population were below the poverty line, including 29.0% of those under age 18 and 7.3% of those age 65 or over.

=== 2000 census ===
As of the census of 2000, there were 7,651 people, 3,208 households, and 2,252 families living in the county. The population density was 2 people per square mile (0.77 people/km^{2}). There were 8,084 housing units at an average density of 2 units per square mile (0.77 units/km^{2}). The racial makeup of the county was 96.43% White, 0.69% Native American, 0.30% Asian, 0.04% Black or African American, 0.04% Pacific Islander, 1.10% from other races, and 1.40% from two or more races. 1.96% of the population were Hispanic or Latino of any race. 19.1% were of German, 16.4% English, 11.3% American and 10.1% Irish ancestry.

There were 3208 households, out of which 28.10% had children under the age of 18 living with them, 60.90% were married couples living together, 5.40% had a female householder with no husband present, and 29.80% were non-families. 24.80% of all households were made up of individuals, and 7.90% had someone living alone who was 65 years of age or older. The average household size was 2.36 and the average family size was 2.81.

In the county, the population was spread out, with 23.70% under the age of 18, 4.40% from 18 to 24, 24.90% from 25 to 44, 32.20% from 45 to 64, and 14.80% who were 65 years of age or older. The median age was 44 years. For every 100 females there were 105.90 males. For every 100 females age 18 and over, there were 104.40 males.

The median income for a household in the county was $36,927, and the median income for a family was $42,283. Males had a median income of $31,113 versus $21,777 for females. The per capita income for the county was $19,246. About 6.20% of families and 9.30% of the population were below the poverty line, including 10.10% of those under age 18 and 5.60% of those age 65 or over.

== Economy ==
The ski resorts of Brundage Mountain, Little Ski Hill, and Tamarack Resort are major employers.

== Government and politics ==
Valley County has long been a Republican stronghold, though it currently gives Democrats larger vote shares than most of Idaho. In 2004, George Bush defeated John Kerry by a 21-point margin (59-38%), whilst in 2008, Valley County was much more competitive than in previous elections, as John McCain defeated Barack Obama by only 7 points (52-45%). Democratic strength is entirely centered around the tourist town of McCall and the surrounding area around the Payette Lake, while the rest of the county remains strongly Republican.

United States presidential election results for Valley County, Idaho
Year	Republican		Democratic		Third party(ies)	
Year	No.	%	No.	%	No.	%
1920	493	60.49%	322	39.51%	0	0.00%
1924	486	40.57%	214	17.86%	498	41.57%
1928	774	64.77%	407	34.06%	14	1.17%
1932	443	30.43%	921	63.26%	92	6.32%
1936	575	29.04%	1,260	63.64%	145	7.32%
1940	761	39.17%	1,165	59.96%	17	0.87%
1944	919	50.52%	896	49.26%	4	0.22%
1948	939	51.00%	828	44.98%	74	4.02%
1952	1,456	72.51%	552	27.49%	0	0.00%
1956	1,285	71.55%	511	28.45%	0	0.00%
1960	1,179	56.28%	916	43.72%	0	0.00%
1964	980	46.53%	1,126	53.47%	0	0.00%
1968	1,160	57.94%	534	26.67%	308	15.38%
1972	1,324	61.55%	537	24.97%	290	13.48%
1976	1,374	59.33%	897	38.73%	45	1.94%
1980	2,041	62.38%	926	28.30%	305	9.32%
1984	2,299	69.96%	945	28.76%	42	1.28%
1988	1,897	59.37%	1,251	39.15%	47	1.47%
1992	1,548	37.27%	1,259	30.32%	1,346	32.41%
1996	2,089	48.83%	1,564	36.56%	625	14.61%
2000	2,548	64.05%	1,129	28.38%	301	7.57%
2004	2,863	59.97%	1,843	38.60%	68	1.42%
2008	2,772	52.33%	2,405	45.40%	120	2.27%
2012	2,664	54.16%	2,095	42.59%	160	3.25%
2016	2,906	54.33%	1,913	35.76%	530	9.91%
2020	3,947	55.88%	2,976	42.14%	140	1.98%
2024	4,214	58.20%	2,869	39.63%	157	2.17%

== Transportation ==
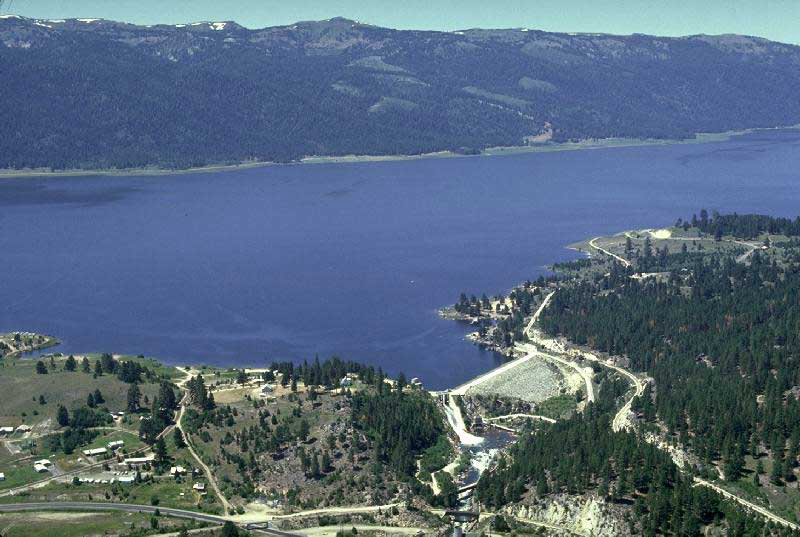
Cascade Dam & reservoir

=== Highways ===
- SH-55 - Payette River Scenic Byway

The county's primary highway is the north–south State Highway 55, the Payette River Scenic Byway, a designated national scenic byway. It heads north from Eagle in Ada County to Horseshoe Bend in Boise County, and climbs the whitewater of the Payette River to Cascade and McCall. The route turns west at Payette Lake in McCall and ends at New Meadows in Adams County, at the junction with US-95.

=== Airports ===
The county has public-use airports owned by the state, by the U.S. Forest Service, and by local municipalities.

- Bernard USFS Airport (U54)
- Big Creek Airport (U60)
- Bruce Meadows Airport (U63)
- Cabin Creek USFS Airport (I08)
- Cascade Airport (U70)
- Donald D. Coski Memorial Airport (U84)
- Indian Creek USFS Airport (S81)
- Johnson Creek Airport (3U2)
- Krassel USFS Airport (24K)
- Landmark USFS Airport (0U0)
- Mahoney Creek USFS Airport (0U3)
- McCall Municipal Airport (MYL)
- Soldier Bar USFS Airport (85U)
- Thomas Creek Airport (2U8)

== Communities ==
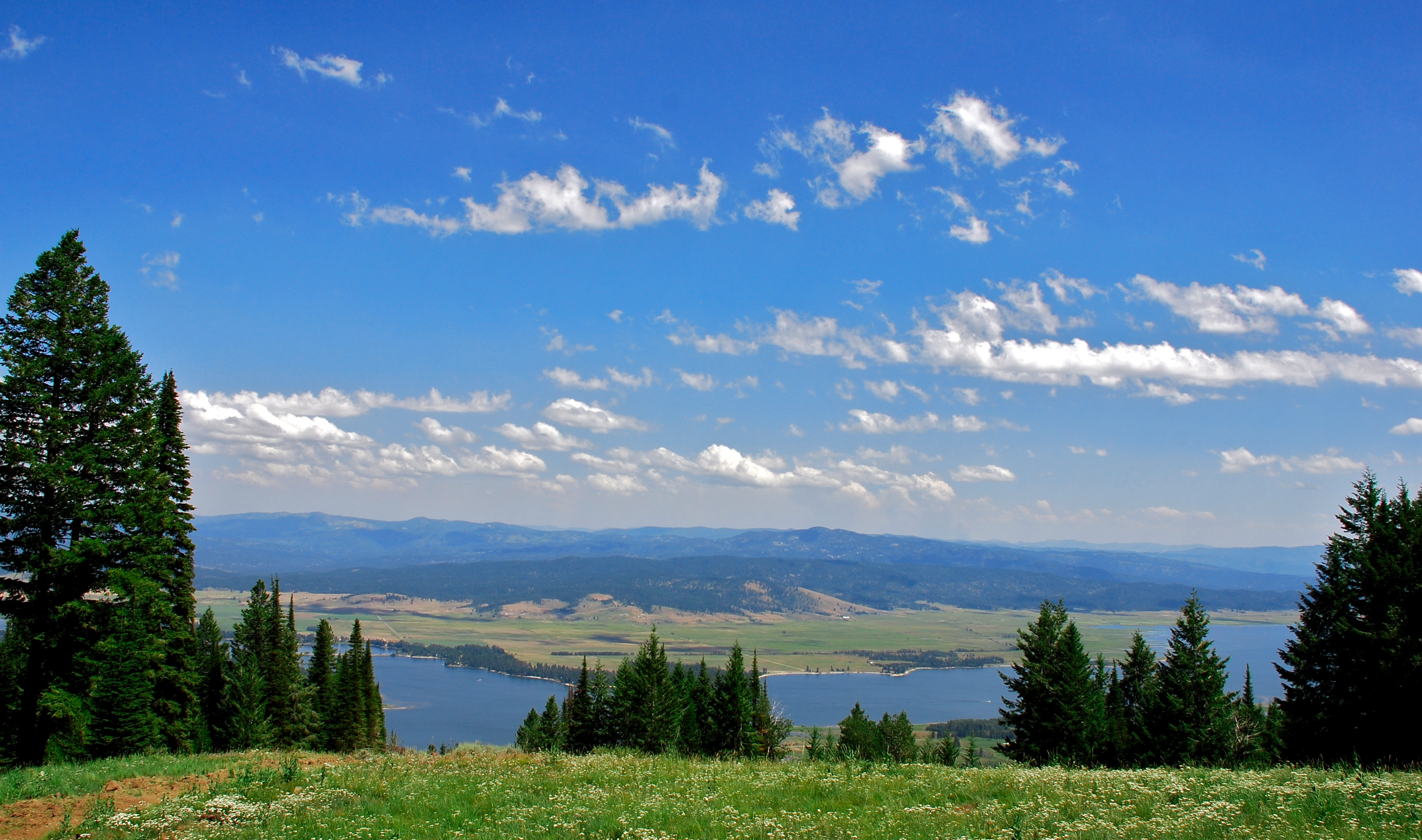
View from the top of West Mountain at Tamarack Resort, overlooking Lake Cascade to the east

=== Cities ===
- Cascade
- Donnelly
- McCall

=== Census-designated places ===
- Smiths Ferry
- Yellow Pine

=== Other unincorporated communities ===
- Big Creek
- Lake Fork
- Roseberry
- Warm Lake

== Education ==
School districts include:

- Cascade School District 422
- McCall-Donnelly Joint School District 421

Residents are in the area (but not the taxation zone) for College of Western Idaho.

== See also ==
- National Register of Historic Places listings in Valley County, Idaho
