= Idaho World War II Army Airfields =

Idaho World War II Army Airfields
- Part of United States Army
- Map Of Idaho World War II Army Airfields

Site information
- Type: Army Airfields

Site history
- Built: 1940-44
- In use: 1940-present

During World War II, the United States Army Air Forces (USAAF) established numerous airfields in Idaho for training pilots and aircrews of USAAF fighters and bombers.

Most of these airfields were under the command of Second Air Force or the Army Air Forces Training Command (AAFTC). However other USAAF support commands (Air Technical Service Command (ATSC); Air Transport Command (ATC); or Troop Carrier Command) had a significant number of airfields.

It is still possible to find remnants of these wartime airfields. Many were converted into municipal airports, some were returned to agriculture and several were retained as U.S. Air Force installations and were front-line bases during the Cold War. Hundreds of the temporary buildings that were used survive today, and are being used for other purposes.

== Major Airfields in Idaho ==
- Gowen Field, Boise

    Assigned to Second Air Force

40th Air Base Squadron/40th Base Headquarters and Air Base Squadron, June 1941-1 April 1944 (See 212th AAFBU)
42nd Bombardment Group (Medium), 3 June 1941-18 January 1942
303rd Bombardment Group (Heavy), 11 February 1942-17 June 1942
306th Bombardment Group (Heavy), 1 March 1942-6 April 1942
308th Bombardment Group (Heavy), 15 April 1942-20 June 1942
Hq and Hq Sq, 15th Bombardment Wing, 23 June 1942-14 November 1942
29th Bombardment Group (Heavy), 25 June 1942-1 April 1944 (See 212th AAFBU)
96th Bombardment Group (Heavy), 6 August 1942-14 August 1942
99th Bombardment Group (Heavy), 28 August 1942-30 September 1942
100th Bombardment Group (Heavy), 28 August 1942-1 November 1942
381st Bombardment Group (Heavy), 3 November 1942-1 December 1942
384th Bombardment Group (Heavy), 1 December 1942-2 January 1943
388th Bombardment Group (Heavy), 24 December 1942-1 February 1943
393rd Bombardment Group (Heavy), 3 March 1943-3 April 1943
445th Bombardment Group (Heavy), 1 April 1943-8 June 1943
399th Bombardment Group (Heavy), 10 April 1943-27 April 1943
448th Bombardment Group (Heavy), 1 May 1943-3 July 1943
450th Bombardment Group (Heavy), 1 May 1943-21 May 1943
Hq and Hq Sq, 15th Bombardment Operational Training Wing, July 1943-May 1944
456th Bombardment Group (Heavy), 14 July 1943-30 July 1943
458th Bombardment Group (Heavy), 28 July 1943-11 September 1943
461st Bombardment Group (Heavy), 29 July 1943-11 September 1943
464th Bombardment Group (Heavy), 22 August 1943-2 October 1943
500th Bombardment Group (Very Heavy), 20 November 1943-12 January 1944
210th Army Air Force Base Unit (Hq, Combat Crew Training Wing), 1 April 1944-May 1944
212th Army Air Force Base Unit (Combat Crew Training Station, Heavy), 1 April 1944-15 February 1945

    Assigned to Fourth Air Force:

425th Army Air Force Base Unit (Combat Crew Training Station, Heavy), 15 February 1945-1 March 1946
Now: Boise Airport and Gowen Field Air National Guard Base (IATA: BOI, ICAO: KBOI)

- Mountain Home Army Air Field, Mountain Home

    Assigned to Second Air Force:

396th Bombardment Group (Heavy), 16 Feb 43-10 Apr 43
470th Bombardment Group (Heavy), 1 May 43-5 Jan 44
20th Base Headquarters and Air Base Squadron, 6 July 1943-1 April 1944 (See 213th AAFBU)
490th Bombardment Group (Heavy), 4 December 1943-10 April 1944
494th Bombardment Group (Heavy), 15 April 1944-1 June 1944
213th Army Air Force Base Unit (Combat Crew Training Station, Heavy), 1 April 1944-15 February 1945

    Assigned to Fourth Air Force:

426th Army Air Force Base Unit (Combat Crew Training Station, Heavy), 15 February 1945-20 October 1945
Now: Mountain Home Air Force Base (IATA: MUO, ICAO: KMUO, FAA LID: MUO)

- Pocatello AAF, Pocatello

    Assigned to Second Air Force:

382nd Base Headquarters and Air Base Squadron, 30 October 1942-1 April 1944(See 265th AAFBU)
96th Bombardment Group (Heavy), 30 October 1942-3 January 1943
19th Bombardment Group (Heavy), 9 December 1942-1 January 1943
382nd Bombardment Group (Heavy), 5 April 1943-6 December 1943
453rd Bombardment Group (Heavy), 29 July 1943-30 September 1943
464th Bombardment Group (Heavy), 2 October 1943-9 February 1944
476th Fighter Group (Single Engine), 26 March 1944-1 April 1944 (See 265th AAFBU)
265th Army Air Force Base Unit (Operational Training Unit, Fighter), 1 April 1944-15 November 1944
508th Fighter Group (Single Engine), 25 October 1944-15 November 1944
Now: Pocatello Regional Airport (IATA: PIH, ICAO: KPIH)
