= German submarine U-41 =

U-41 may refer to one of the following German submarines:

- SM U-41 (Germany), was a Type U 31 submarine launched in 1914 and that served in the First World War until sunk 24 September 1915
  - During the First World War, Germany also had these submarines with similar names:
    - SM UB-41, a Type UB II submarine launched in 1916 and sunk on 5 October 1917
    - SM UC-41, a Type UC II submarine launched in 1916 and sunk on 21 August 1917
- German submarine U-41 (1939), a Type IX submarine that served in the Second World War until sunk on 5 February 1940
