= St. Maries Municipal Airport =

Coordinates: 47°19′32.9200″N 116°34′36.0400″W

- IATA: none; ICAO: none; FAA LID: S72

Summary
- Airport type: Public
- Owner: Benewah County
- Serves: St. Maries, Idaho
- Location: St. Maries, Idaho
- Elevation AMSL: 2,131 ft / 649.5 m
- Interactive map of St. Maries Municipal Airport

Runways
Direction	Length		Surface
Direction	ft	m	Surface
10/28	3,354	1,022	Asphalt

Statistics (2013)
- Aircraft operations: 13,100
- Based aircraft: 27

St. Maries Municipal Airport (IATA: S72) is a county-owned public use airport located in St. Maries, a city in Benewah County, Idaho. The airport is approximately one mile northwest of downtown St. Maries. It was first opened in April, 1940, and sits on 65 acres of land.

== See also ==
- List of airports in Idaho
