= Cabin Creek USFS Airport =

Airport in Idaho, United States

- IATA: none; ICAO: none; FAA LID: I08

Summary
- Airport type: Public
- Owner: U.S. Forest Service
- Serves: Big Creek Ranger Station, Idaho
- Elevation AMSL: 4,289 ft (1,307 m)
- Coordinates: 45°08′37″N 114°55′44″W

Map
- Location within Idaho

Runways
Direction	Length		Surface
Direction	ft	m	Surface
2/20	1,750	533	Turf/dirt

Statistics (2008)
- Aircraft operations: 900
- Source: Federal Aviation Administration

Cabin Creek USFS Airport (FAA LID: I08) is a public-use airport in Valley County, Idaho, United States. It is located 17 nautical miles (31 km) east of Big Creek Ranger Station. The airport is owned by the U.S. Forest Service. The airstrip is near Cabin Creek in the Payette National Forest.

== Facilities and aircraft ==
Cabin Creek USFS Airport covers an area of 4 acres (1.6 ha) at an elevation of 4,289 feet (1,307 m) above mean sea level. It has one runway designated 2/20 with a turf and dirt surface measuring 1,750 by 40 feet (533 x 12 m). For the 12-month period ending August 27, 2008, the airport had 900 aircraft operations, an average of 75 per month: 67% air taxi and 33% general aviation.

== See also ==
- List of airports in Idaho
