= Small nucleolar RNA SNORD61 =

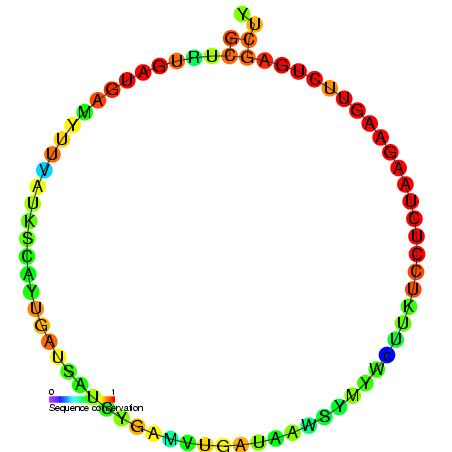
- Predicted secondary structure and sequence conservation of SNORD61

Identifiers
- Symbol: SNORD61
- Alt. Symbols: U61
- Rfam: RF00270

Other data
- RNA type: Gene; snRNA; snoRNA; C/D-box
- Domain: Eukaryota
- GO: GO:0006396 GO:0005730
- SO: SO:0000593
- PDB structures: PDBe

In molecular biology, snoRNA U61 (also known as SNORD61) is a non-coding RNA (ncRNA) molecule which functions in the modification of other small nuclear RNAs (snRNAs). This type of modifying RNA is usually located in the nucleolus of the eukaryotic cell which is a major site of snRNA biogenesis. It is known as a small nucleolar RNA (snoRNA) and also often referred to as a guide RNA.

snoRNA U61 belongs to the C/D box class of snoRNAs which contain the conserved sequence motifs known as the C box (UGAUGA) and the D box (CUGA). Most of the members of the box C/D family function in directing site-specific 2'-O-methylation of substrate RNAs.

U61 snoRNA was cloned from HeLa cells and is predicted to guide the 2'O-ribose methylation of 18S ribosomal RNA (rRNA) residue U1442.
