= Pocatello Regional Airport =

Airport in Power County, Idaho, United States

Pocatello Regional Airport (formerly Pocatello Army Airfield)
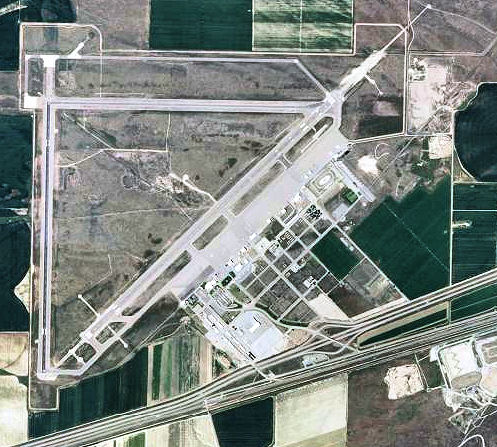
- USGS 2006 orthophoto
- IATA: PIH; ICAO: KPIH; FAA LID: PIH; WMO: 72578

Summary
- Airport type: Public
- Owner: City of Pocatello
- Serves: Pocatello, Idaho
- Location: Bannock County, Idaho
- Elevation AMSL: 4,452 ft (1,357 m)
- Coordinates: 42°54′35″N 112°35′45″W
- Website: www.iflypocatello.com

Map
- Location in Idaho Location in the United States

Runways
Direction	Length		Surface
Direction	ft	m	Surface
3/21	9,059	2,761	Asphalt
17/35	7,150	2,179	Asphalt

Statistics (2018)
- Aircraft operations: 27,317
- Based aircraft: 48
- Source: Federal Aviation Administration

Pocatello Regional Airport (IATA: PIH, ICAO: KPIH, FAA LID: PIH) is a city-owned, public-use airport in the western United States, located in Power County, Idaho, seven nautical miles (13 km) northwest of central Pocatello.

The airport is built on the site of the Pocatello Army Airfield, a World War II training base. Many of the base facilities have been razed, although four large hangars remain; it is also home to the Pocatello office of the National Weather Service. Bounded on the south by Interstate 86, the airport is several miles southeast of American Falls Reservoir.

As per the Federal Aviation Administration (FAA), this airport had 25,756 passenger boardings (enplanements) in calendar year 2008, 21,039 in 2009, and 20,825 in 2010. The National Plan of Integrated Airport Systems for 2011–2015 categorized it as a primary commercial service airport.

The airport is home to the Kizuna Garden, built to commemorate the bond between Pocatello and its sister city Iwamizawa, Japan.

== Facilities and aircraft ==
Pocatello Regional Airport covers an area of 3,374 acres (5.3 sq mi; 13.7 km^{2}) at an elevation of 4,452 feet (1,357 m) above sea level. It has two runways with asphalt surfaces: 3/21 is 9,059 by 150 feet (2,761 by 46 m) and 17/35 is 7,150 by 100 feet (2,179 by 30 m).

For the 12-month period ending December 31, 2018, the airport had 27,317 aircraft operations, an average of 75 per day: 70% general aviation, 25% air taxi, 4% scheduled commercial, and 1% military. At that time there were 48 aircraft based at this airport: 35 single-engine, 7 multi-engine, 5 jet, and 1 helicopter.

== History ==
- In 1943, the Pocatello Army Airfield was built as a Second Air Force heavy bomber (B-17, B-24) training base. By 1949, the new airfield had become a surplus property and was obtained by the city of Pocatello to build a commercial airport.
- While the starting date is unknown, Western Air Lines served Pocatello for a number of years, but discontinued all service by 1980. According to the airline's August 1, 1968 system timetable, Western operated Lockheed L-188 Electra turboprops into Pocatello. In September of 1973, this service was replaced with the new and more efficient Boeing 737-200, which offered nonstop flights to Salt Lake City, Las Vegas and Los Angeles. After discontinuing mainline flights, the airline subsequently served the airport as Western Express which was operated as code share service by SkyWest with commuter turboprop aircraft. Western merged with Delta Air Lines in 1987, and SkyWest continues to operate the code share service as Delta Connection.
- In the mid 1970s, Hughes Airwest served the airport with Douglas DC-9-10 and DC-9-30 jetliners, according to the February 1, 1976 edition of the North American Official Airline Guide.
- Gem State Airlines provided non-stop service to Idaho Falls and Twin Falls in the late 1970s.
- In the mid 1980s, Cascade Airways served Pocatello with British Aircraft Corporation BAC One-Eleven twin jets, according to the February 15, 1985 edition of the North American Official Airline Guide (OAG). The OAG also lists Cascade flights operated with smaller Fairchild Metro commuter turboprops.
- Horizon Air served Pocatello until January 7, 2006, originally with service to Salt Lake City in 1983. The airline canceled that service in favor of flights to Boise starting in 1984 operated with de Havilland Canada DHC-8 Dash 8 turboprops.
- Big Sky Airlines served Pocatello from the day Horizon canceled service until March 30, 2007.
- In 2014, a World War II-era mortar was found on the airport grounds while doing routine maintenance work. The mortar was safely removed by law enforcement.
- In 2024, NASA retired their Douglas DC-8 from the fleet, before retiring, NASA flew across the United States and landed in Pocatello, and is still currently restored there. This Douglas DC-8 was one of about 3 total aircraft that were still flying at the time. The DC-8 was donated to the airport for education use for Idaho State University. The aircraft sits next to the taxiway and general aviation parking area of the airport.

== Airline and destination ==
Airlines	Destinations
Delta Connection	Salt Lake City

Destinations map
Destinations from Pocatello Regional Airport

=== Statistics ===
Carrier shares: (January – December 2025)
Carrier	Passengers (arriving and departing)
SkyWest	37,270(100%)

Top domestic destinations: (January – December 2025)
Rank	Airport	Passengers	Airline
1	Salt Lake City International (SLC)	19,030	Delta Connection

== See also ==
- Idaho World War II Army Airfields
- List of airports in Idaho
