= Small nucleolar RNA SNORD60 =

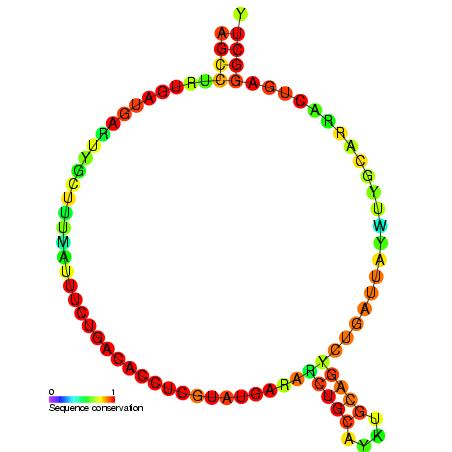
- Predicted secondary structure and sequence conservation of SNORD60

Identifiers
- Symbol: SNORD60
- Alt. Symbols: U60
- Rfam: RF00271

Other data
- RNA type: Gene; snRNA; snoRNA; CD-box
- Domain: Eukaryota
- GO: GO:0006396 GO:0005730
- SO: SO:0000593
- PDB structures: PDBe

In molecular biology, Small nucleolar RNA SNORD60 (also known as U60) is a non-coding RNA that belongs to the C/D class of small nucleolar RNA (snoRNA). Most of the members of the box C/D family function in directing site-specific 2'-O-methylation of substrate RNAs.
