= Atomic City, Idaho =

City in Bingham County, Idaho, United States

- unincorporated area
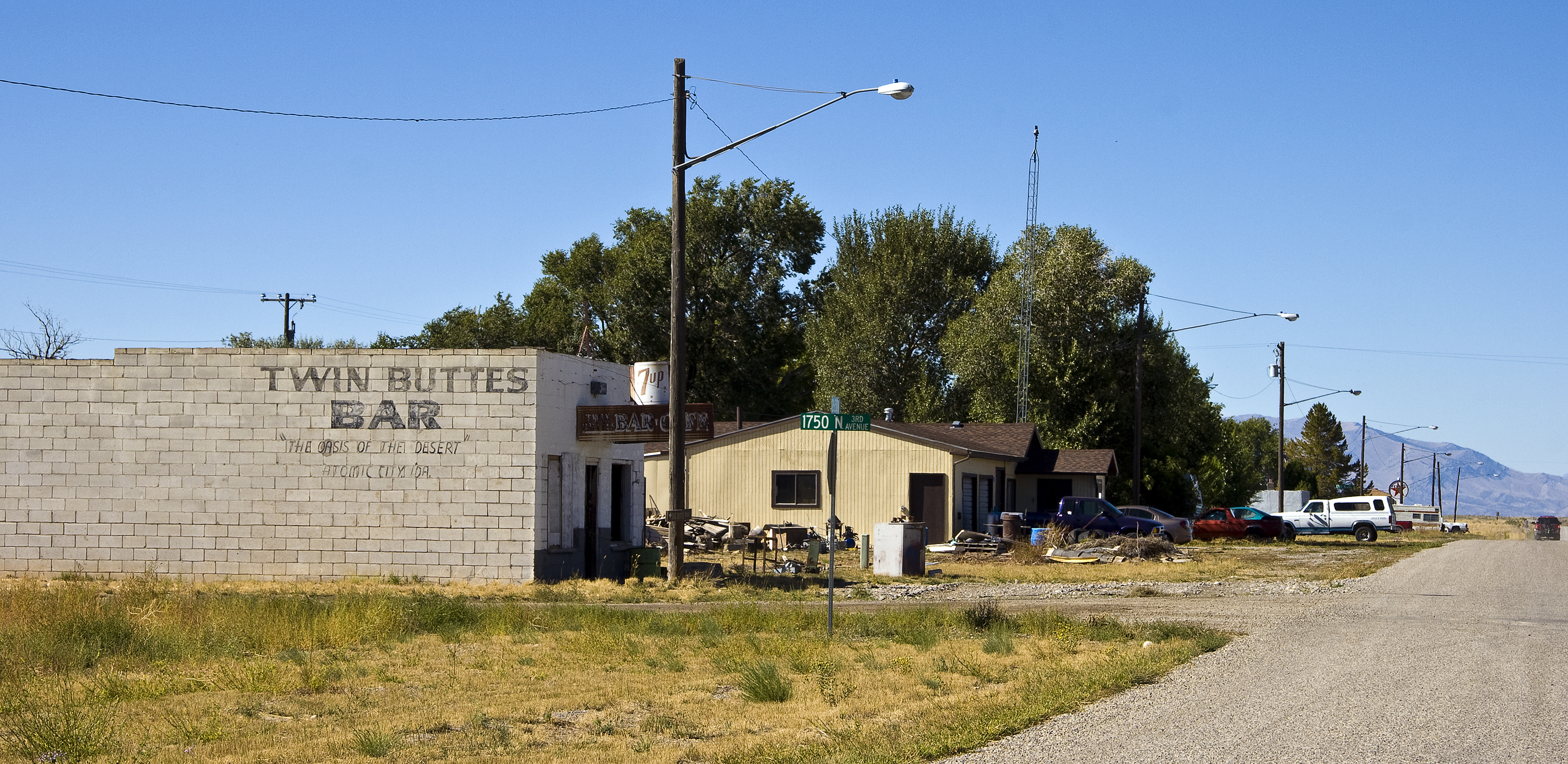
- Downtown Atomic City, September 2010

- Location of Atomic City in Bingham County, Idaho.

- Location in Idaho Atomic City (the United States) Atomic City (North America)
- Coordinates: 43°26′35″N 112°48′45″W
- Country: United States
- State: Idaho
- County: Bingham

Area
  - Total: 0.081 sq mi (0.21 km^{2})
  - Land: 0.081 sq mi (0.21 km^{2})
  - Water: 0 sq mi (0.00 km^{2})
- Elevation: 5,020 ft (1,530 m)

Population (2020)
  - Total: 41
  - Density: 340.1/sq mi (131.33/km^{2})
- Time zone: UTC-7 (Mountain (MST))
  - Summer (DST): UTC-6 (MDT)
- ZIP code: 83215
- Area codes: 208, 986
- FIPS code: 16-03970
- GNIS feature ID: 2409751

Atomic City is an unincorporated area in Bingham County, Idaho, United States. The population was 41 at the 2020 census, up from 29 in 2010.

== History ==
Atomic City was called "Midway" until 1950, as it is halfway between the towns of Blackfoot and Arco (home of Experimental Breeder Reactor I, the world's first electricity-generating nuclear power plant). Atomic City had a larger population when the neighboring Idaho National Laboratory site was newer, known as the "National Reactor Testing Station" until 1975. Atomic City disincorporated after residents approved through an election in 2020.

There is one store and one bar in Atomic City; the store no longer sells gasoline, due to new laws pertaining to its underground gas tanks.

== Geography ==
According to the United States Census Bureau, the city has a total area of 0.11 square miles (0.28 km^{2}), all of it land.

Atomic City is just south of the Idaho National Laboratory site, on U.S. Route 26.

=== Climate ===
According to the Köppen Climate Classification system, Atomic City has a semi-arid climate, abbreviated "BSk" on climate maps.

== Demographics ==
=== 2010 census ===
Historical population
Census	Pop.	Note	%±
1960	141		—
1970	24		−83.0%
1980	34		41.7%
1990	25		−26.5%
2000	25		0.0%
2010	29		16.0%
2020	41		41.4%
U.S. Decennial Census

At the 2010 census there were 29 people in 17 households, including 9 families, in the city. The population density was 263.6 inhabitants per square mile (101.8/km^{2}). There were 48 housing units at an average density of 436.4 per square mile (168.5/km^{2}). The racial makeup of the city was 96.6% White and 3.4% Native American. Hispanic or Latino of any race were 3.4%.

Of the 17 households 52.9% were married couples living together and 47.1% were non-families. 35.3% of households were made up of individuals. The average household size was 1.71 and the average family size was 2.11.

The median age was 59.8 years. 0.0% of residents were under the age of 18; 0.0% were between the ages of 18 and 24; 6.9% were from 25 to 44; 58.6% were from 45 to 64; and 34.5% were 65 or older. The gender makeup of the city was 48.3% male and 51.7% female.

=== 2000 census ===
As of the census of 2000, there were 25 people in 16 households, including 7 families, in the city. The population density was 245.4 inhabitants per square mile (94.7/km^{2}). There were 22 housing units at an average density of 216.0 per square mile (83.4/km^{2}). 24 of the residents were White, and one was Asian.

Of the 16 households one has a child under the age of 18 living with them, six were married couples living together, and nine were non-families. Nine households were made up of individuals, and two had someone living alone who was 65 or older. The average household size was 1.56 and the average family size was 2.29.

The age distribution was one person under the age of 18, one from 18 to 24, two from 25 to 44, twelve from 45 to 64, and eight who were 65 or older. The median age was 58 years. Ten citizens were females and fifteen were males; one of the males was under 18.

The median household income was $9,375 and the median family income was $8,750. Males had a median income of $43,750 versus $8,750 for females. The per capita income for the city was $16,276. 57.1% of the population and 62.5% of families were below the poverty line. None of those under 18 and half of those 65 and older were living below the poverty line.

== See also ==
- List of cities in Idaho
