= Indian Creek USFS Airport =

- IATA: none; ICAO: none; FAA LID: S81

Summary
- Airport type: Public
- Owner: U.S. Forest Service
- Serves: Indian Creek, Idaho
- Elevation AMSL: 4,701 ft (1,433 m)
- Coordinates: 44°45′40″N 115°06′26″W
- Interactive map of Indian Creek USFS Airport

Runways
Direction	Length		Surface
Direction	ft	m	Surface
4/22	4,650	1,417	Dirt

Statistics (2009)
- Aircraft operations: 3,028
- Source: Federal Aviation Administration

Indian Creek USFS Airport (FAA LID: S81) is a public use airport located at Indian Creek in Valley County, Idaho, United States. It is owned by the U.S. Forest Service. The airstrip is situated next to the Middle Fork Salmon River.

== Facilities and aircraft ==
Indian Creek USFS Airport covers an area of 37 acres (15 ha) at an elevation of 4,701 feet (1,433 m) above mean sea level. It has one runway designated 4/22 with a dirt surface measuring 4,650 by 40 feet (1,417 x 12 m). For the 12-month period ending April 21, 2009, the airport had 3,028 aircraft operations, an average of 252 per month: 66% general aviation and 34% air taxi.

== See also ==
- List of airports in Idaho
