= Bear Lake County Airport =

- IATA: none; ICAO: none; FAA LID: 1U7

Summary
- Airport type: Public
- Owner: Bear Lake County
- Serves: Paris, Idaho
- Elevation AMSL: 5,932 ft (1,808 m)
- Coordinates: 42°14′59″N 111°20′30″W

Map
- Location of airport in Idaho

Runways
Direction	Length		Surface
Direction	ft	m	Surface
10/28	5,728	1,746	Asphalt
16/34	4,590	1,399	Asphalt

Statistics (2012)
- Aircraft operations: 2,400
- Based aircraft: 4
- Source: Federal Aviation Administration

Bear Lake County Airport (FAA LID: 1U7) is a county-owned, public-use airport in Bear Lake County, Idaho, United States. It is located three nautical miles (6 km) east of the central business district of Paris, Idaho. This airport is included in the National Plan of Integrated Airport Systems for 2011–2015, which categorized it as a general aviation facility.

== Facilities and aircraft ==
Bear Lake County Airport covers an area of 1,180 acres (478 ha) at an elevation of 5,932 feet (1,808 m) above mean sea level. It has two runways with asphalt surfaces: 10/28 is 5,728 by 75 feet (1,746 x 23 m) and 16/34 is 4,590 by 60 feet (1,399 x 18 m).

For the 12-month period ending July 6, 2012, the airport had 2,400 general aviation aircraft operations, an average of 200 per month. At that time there were four single-engine aircraft based at this airport.

== See also ==
- List of airports in Idaho
