= German submarine U-60 =

U-60 may refer to one of the following German submarines:

- SM U-60, a Type U-57 submarine launched in 1916 and that served in the First World War until surrendered on 21 November 1918; foundered in the English Channel en route to breakers June 1919
  - During the First World War, Germany also had these submarines with similar names:
    - SM UB-60, a Type UB III submarine launched in 1917 and surrendered on 26 November 1918; foundered in the English Channel en route to breakers on 12 June 1919
    - SM UC-60, a Type UC II submarine launched in 1916 and surrendered on 23 February 1919; broken up at Rainham in 1921
- German submarine U-60 (1939), a Type IIC submarine that served in the Second World War until scuttled 2 May 1945
