= Small nucleolar RNA SNORD41 =

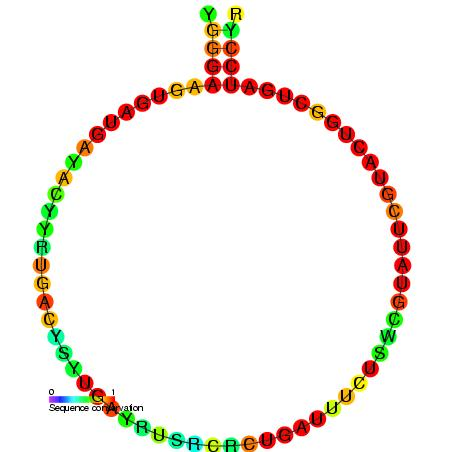
- Predicted secondary structure and sequence conservation of SNORD41

Identifiers
- Symbol: SNORD41
- Alt. Symbols: snoU41
- Rfam: RF00588

Other data
- RNA type: Gene; snRNA; snoRNA; C/D-box
- Domain: Eukaryota
- GO: GO:0006396 GO:0005730
- SO: SO:0000593
- PDB structures: PDBe

In molecular biology, snoRNA U41 (also known as SNORD41) belongs to the C/D box class of snoRNAs. It is predicted to guide 2'O-ribose methylation of the large 28S rRNA on residue U4276.
