= Twin Bridges Airport (Idaho) =

Coordinates: 43°56′37″N 114°06′37″W

- IATA: none; ICAO: none; FAA LID: U61

Summary
- Airport type: Public
- Owner: State of Idaho
- Operator: Idaho Transportation Dept., Div. of Aeronautics
- Serves: Ketchum, Idaho
- Elevation AMSL: 6,893 ft / 2,101 m

Map
- Interactive map of Twin Bridges Airport

Runways
Direction	Length		Surface
Direction	ft	m	Surface
3/21	4,450	1,356	Turf

Statistics (2005)
- Aircraft operations: 800
- Source: Federal Aviation Administration

Twin Bridges Airport (FAA LID: U61) is a state-owned public-use airstrip located 22 miles (35 km) northeast of the central business district of Ketchum, a city in Custer County, Idaho, United States.

== Facilities and aircraft ==
Twin Bridges Airport covers an area of 60 acres (24 ha) which contains one runway (3/21) with a turf surface measuring 4,450 x 100 ft (1,356 x 30 m). For the 12-month period ending August 17, 2005, the airport had 800 aircraft operations: 75% general aviation and 25% air taxi. The airport is located close to the Big Lost River in a narrow valley. Approaches to runway 21 must be flown off the extended runway centerline due to a mountain.

== See also ==
- List of airports in Idaho
