= Nampa Municipal Airport =

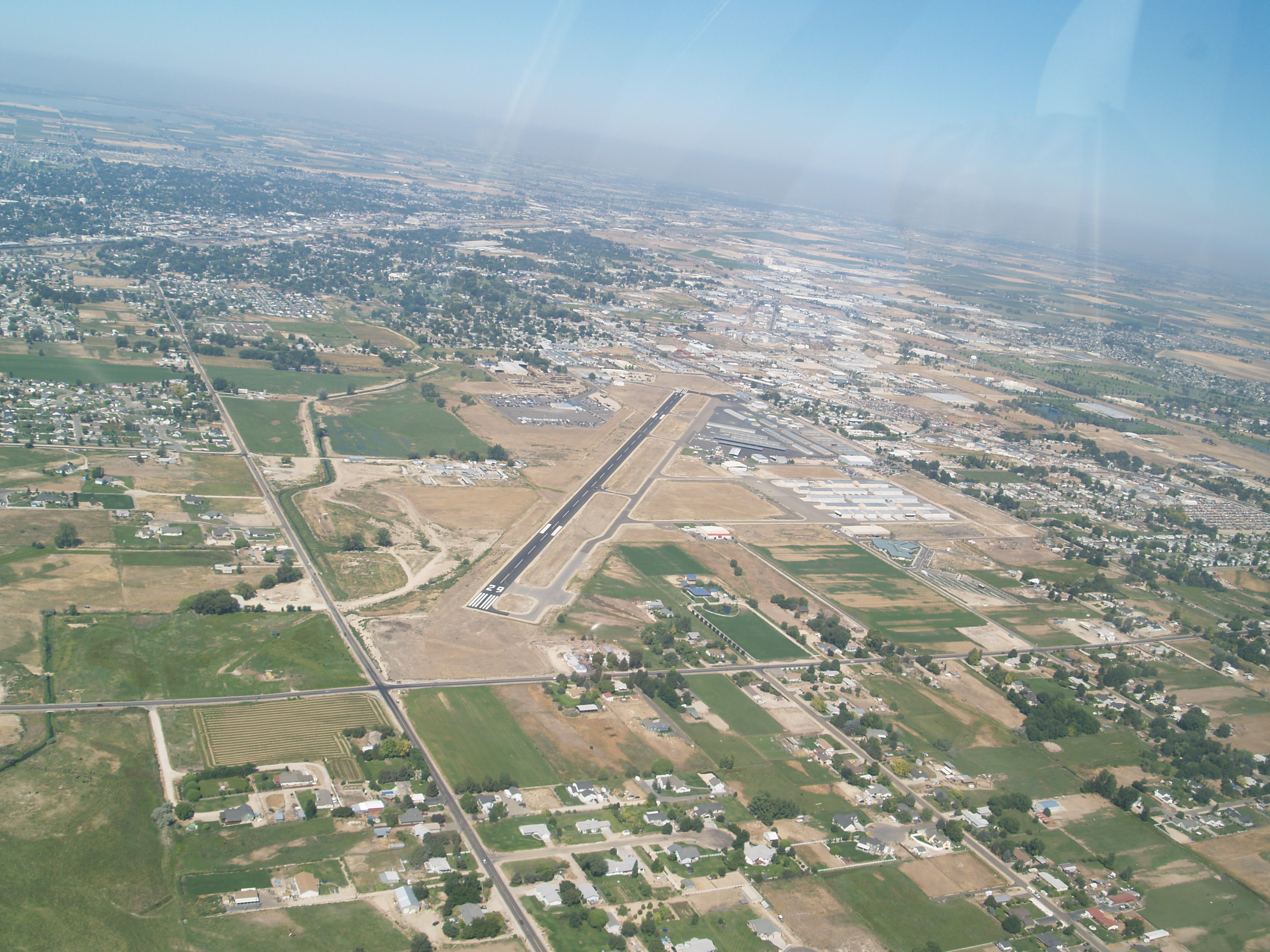
- Aerial view, 2007
- IATA: none; ICAO: KMAN; FAA LID: MAN

Summary
- Airport type: Public
- Owner: City of Nampa
- Serves: Nampa, Idaho
- Elevation AMSL: 2,537 ft / 773 m
- Coordinates: 43°34′53″N 116°31′23″W
- Website: www.NampaAirport.org

Map
- Interactive map of Nampa Municipal Airport

Runways
Direction	Length		Surface
Direction	ft	m	Surface
11/29	5,000	1,524	Asphalt

Statistics (2007)
- Aircraft operations: 105,600
- Based aircraft: 277
- Sources: Airport website and FAA

Nampa Municipal Airport (ICAO: KMAN, FAA LID: MAN, formerly S67) is a city-owned public airport in Nampa, in Canyon County, Idaho. The FAA's National Plan of Integrated Airport Systems for 2009–2013 called it a general aviation airport.

It is used for private, emergency, military and industrial aviation and is home to the Warhawk Air Museum. The airport has ongoing hangar construction. The Civil Air Patrol Nampa Squadron is on airport grounds co-located with EAA in the Shep-Rock hangar. Nampa Municipal Airport is a member of Rocky Mountain Air and the Snake River Flight Training Club. Mission Aviation Fellowship is also headquartered at the Nampa Airport.

Most U.S. airports use the same three-letter location identifier for the FAA and IATA, but this airport is assigned MAN by the FAA and has no designation from the IATA (which assigned MAN to Manchester Airport in Manchester, England, United Kingdom).

== Facilities and aircraft ==
Nampa Municipal Airport covers 126 acres (51 ha) at an elevation of 2,537 feet (773 m) above mean sea level. It has one asphalt runway, 11/29, 5,000 by 75 feet (1,524 x 23 m).

In the year ending June 20, 2007 the airport had 105,600 aircraft operations, average 289 per day: 98.5% general aviation and 1.5% air taxi. 277 aircraft were then based at this airport: 86.6% single-engine, 2.9% multi-engine, 2.5% helicopter, 4% glider and 4% ultralight.

== Services ==
Services are for pilots only. Some services include cheap aircraft stowing, pilot service (such as a lounge, internet access, and rentals), and transportation. The airport also offers full service during business hours. Upstairs in the Ops building is the Tower Grill. The restaurant is open to the public.

== See also ==
- List of airports in Idaho
