= German submarine U-61 =

U-61 may refer to one of the following German submarines:

- SM U-61, a Type U 57 submarine launched in 1916 and that served in the First World War until sunk on 26 March 1918
  - During the First World War, Germany also had these submarines with similar names:
    - SM UB-61, a Type UB III submarine launched in 1917 and sunk 29 November 1917
    - SM UC-61, a Type UC II submarine launched in 1916 and scuttled on 26 July 1917
- German submarine U-61 (1939), a Type IIC submarine that served in the Second World War until scuttled 2 May 1945
