= Dubois Municipal Airport (Idaho) =

- IATA: DBS; ICAO: none; FAA LID: U41

Summary
- Airport type: Public
- Owner: City of Dubois
- Serves: Dubois, Idaho
- Elevation AMSL: 5,123 ft (1,561 m)
- Coordinates: 44°09′44″N 112°13′14″W

Map
- Location of airport in Idaho U41 (the United States)

Runways
Direction	Length		Surface
Direction	ft	m	Surface
16/34	4,600	1,402	Gravel/dirt

Statistics (2011)
- Aircraft operations: 1,010
- Source: Federal Aviation Administration

Dubois Municipal Airport (IATA: DBS, FAA LID: U41) is a city-owned, public-use airport located one nautical mile (2 km) southeast of the central business district of Dubois, a city in Clark County, Idaho, United States.

== Facilities and aircraft ==
Dubois Municipal Airport covers an area of 305 acres (123 ha) at an elevation of 5,123 feet (1,561 m) above mean sea level. It has one runway designated 16/34 with a gravel and dirt surface measuring 4,600 by 100 feet (1,402 x 30 m).

For the 12-month period ending August 4, 2011, the airport had 1,010 aircraft operations, an average of 84 per month: 99% general aviation and 1% military.

== See also ==
- List of airports in Idaho
