= Yellow Pine, Idaho =

Census-designated place in Valley County, Idaho, United States

- Census-designated place
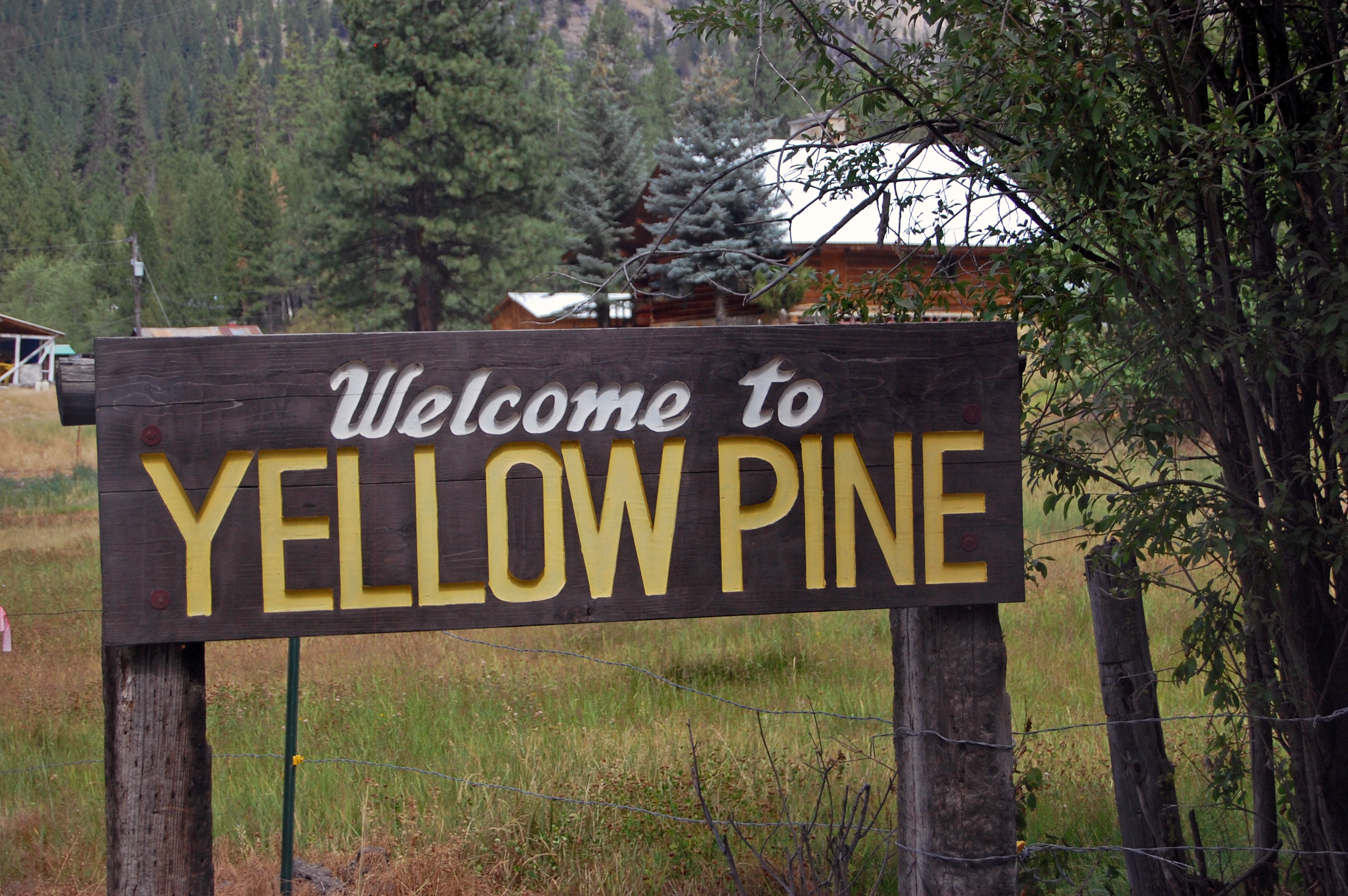
- Sign seen when entering town

- Location of Yellow Pine in Valley County, Idaho.
- Coordinates: 44°57′45″N 115°29′37″W
- Country: United States
- State: Idaho
- County: Valley

Area
  - Total: 0.995 sq mi (2.58 km^{2})
  - Land: 0.984 sq mi (2.55 km^{2})
  - Water: 0.011 sq mi (0.028 km^{2})
- Elevation: 4,961 ft (1,512 m)

Population (2020)
  - Total: 32
- Time zone: UTC-7 (Mountain (MST))
  - Summer (DST): UTC-6 (MDT)
- ZIP code: 83677
- Area code: 208
- FIPS code: 16-88660
- GNIS feature ID: 2585596

Yellow Pine is a census-designated place in Valley County, Idaho, United States. As of the 2020 census, its population was 32. Yellow Pine has an area of 0.995 square miles (2.58 km^{2}); 0.984 square miles (2.55 km^{2}) of this is land, and 0.011 square miles (0.028 km^{2}) is water.

== History ==
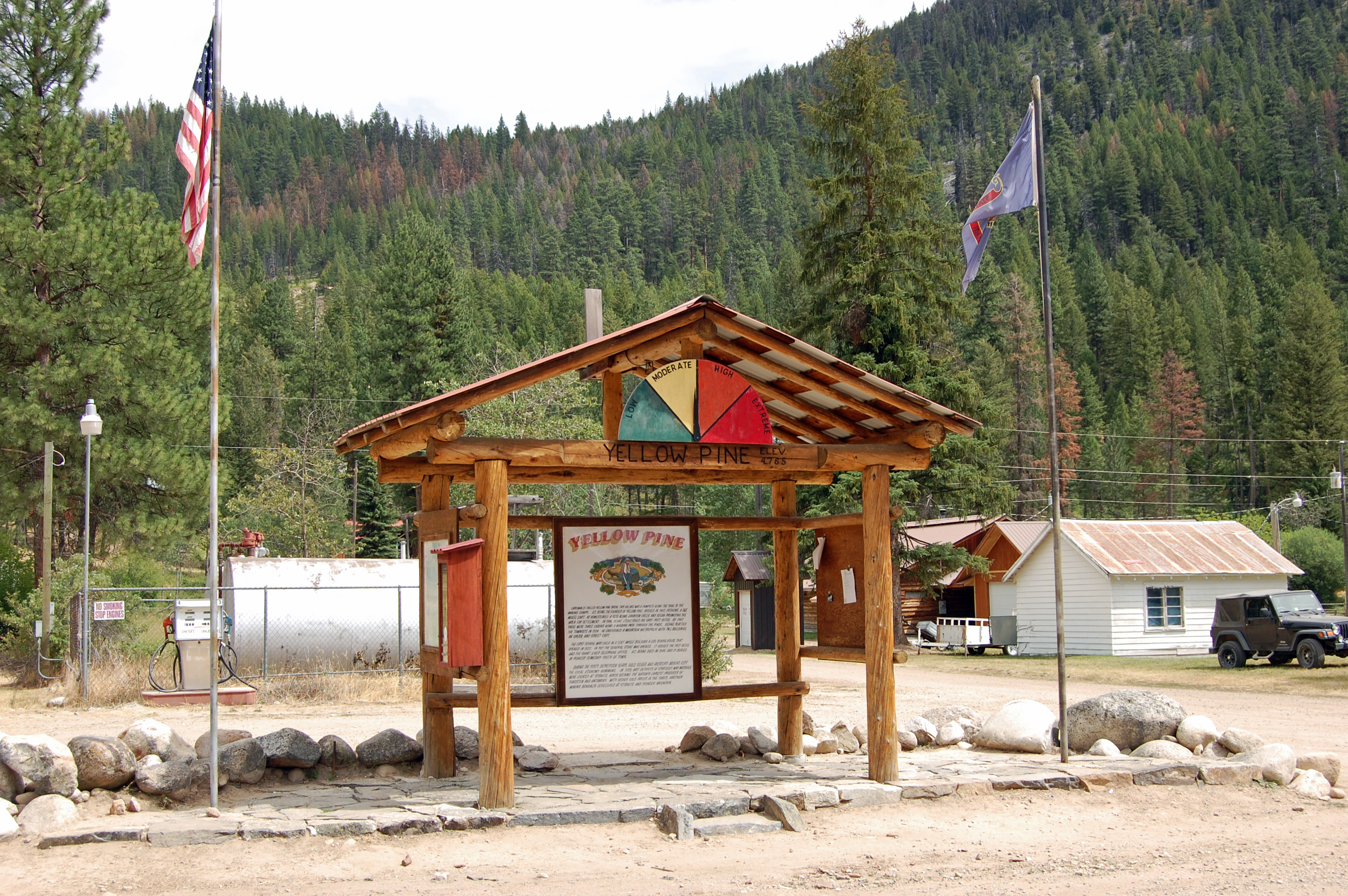
Yellow Pine's informational sign, August 2011

In 1906, Albert Behne established the first post office and mail service. In 1924, he received the patent on the 47½ acres where the village presently exists. In 1930, at the age of 76, he platted the original Yellow Pine townsite.

Other original patentees were Oscar Ray Call, Behne's former mining partner, and Henry Abstein. Abstein, the first patentee in the area, homesteaded 160 acres (0.65 km^{2}) north and east of the present townsite. Although his primary interest was mining, he was also an active horticulturist and many of the apple trees that he planted are still living today. His original holdings have since been subdivided.

Yellow Pine is located 50 miles (80 km) east of McCall, via the Lick Creek road (open seasonally); 65 miles (105 km) from Cascade, via the Warm Lake and Johnson Creek Roads (open seasonally); and 70 miles (110 km) from Cascade via the Warm Lake and South Fork Roads (open year around).

== Demographics ==
Historical population
Census	Pop.	Note	%±
2020	32		—
U.S. Decennial Census

== Geography ==
Although unincorporated, the community has its own zip code, 83677, where overall 44 people live on a total land area of 174.269 square miles (451.35 km^{2}), according to the 2010 census.

Yellow Pine is a 247-acre (1.00 km^{2}) "inholder" community in eastern Valley County, located on the East Fork of the South Fork of the Salmon River, approximately half a mile upstream from its confluence with Johnson Creek. It is bounded on the north by the Payette National Forest and on the south by the Boise National Forest. Located at 4,802 feet (1,464 m), Yellow Pine has historically served as the trade center for the larger Yellow Pine basin mining area, including the Stibnite Mining District. Many of the early miner-settlers came from Warren, Idaho.

== Climate ==
Yellow Pine has a dry-summer humid continental climate (Köppen Dsb), bordering on a subarctic climate (Dfc). Summers are pleasant, with warm days and chilly nights with lows close to freezing. Winters are cold and snowy, with lows reaching the single digits and annual snowfall averaging 104 inches (260 cm). Max snowpack depth averages 24 inches (61 cm) and is usually reached during the month of February.

Climate data for Yellow Pine, Idaho, 1991–2020 normals, extremes 1926–present
Month	Jan	Feb	Mar	Apr	May	Jun	Jul	Aug	Sep	Oct	Nov	Dec	Year
Record high °F (°C)	57 (14)	63 (17)	73 (23)	85 (29)	91 (33)	104 (40)	101 (38)	103 (39)	101 (38)	92 (33)	70 (21)	56 (13)	104 (40)
Mean maximum °F (°C)	47 (8)	53 (12)	60 (16)	70 (21)	80 (27)	86 (30)	93 (34)	92 (33)	86 (30)	77 (25)	58 (14)	45 (7)	94 (34)
Mean daily maximum °F (°C)	36.1 (2.3)	40.4 (4.7)	46.3 (7.9)	55.7 (13.2)	64.1 (17.8)	73.9 (23.3)	86.6 (30.3)	86.5 (30.3)	76.4 (24.7)	59.4 (15.2)	43.0 (6.1)	33.6 (0.9)	58.5 (14.7)
Daily mean °F (°C)	24.2 (−4.3)	28.2 (−2.1)	34.6 (1.4)	42.3 (5.7)	49.7 (9.8)	57.7 (14.3)	65.8 (18.8)	65.5 (18.6)	56.8 (13.8)	44.7 (7.1)	32.5 (0.3)	24.1 (−4.4)	43.8 (6.6)
Mean daily minimum °F (°C)	12.2 (−11.0)	16.1 (−8.8)	23.0 (−5.0)	29.0 (−1.7)	35.2 (1.8)	41.5 (5.3)	45.1 (7.3)	44.6 (7.0)	37.3 (2.9)	30.0 (−1.1)	22.1 (−5.5)	14.7 (−9.6)	29.2 (−1.5)
Mean minimum °F (°C)	−15 (−26)	−10 (−23)	1 (−17)	14 (−10)	22 (−6)	27 (−3)	32 (0)	31 (−1)	23 (−5)	13 (−11)	−2 (−19)	−12 (−24)	−21 (−29)
Record low °F (°C)	−35 (−37)	−23 (−31)	−20 (−29)	−4 (−20)	18 (−8)	22 (−6)	26 (−3)	22 (−6)	18 (−8)	−1 (−18)	−13 (−25)	−33 (−36)	−35 (−37)
Average precipitation inches (mm)	2.69 (68)	1.97 (50)	2.67 (68)	2.10 (53)	1.79 (45)	2.13 (54)	0.91 (23)	0.71 (18)	1.33 (34)	2.05 (52)	2.72 (69)	2.97 (75)	24.04 (609)
Average snowfall inches (cm)	23.7 (60)	14.6 (37)	8.7 (22)	4.7 (12)	0.8 (2.0)	0.1 (0.25)	0.0 (0.0)	0.0 (0.0)	0.1 (0.25)	2.5 (6.4)	16.6 (42)	26.4 (67)	98.2 (248.9)
Average precipitation days (≥ 0.01 in)	12.1	12.6	14.9	12.3	11.4	11.4	4.6	5.5	7.3	11.6	12.0	14.7	130.4
Average snowy days (≥ 0.1 in)	9.8	7.3	5.4	2.5	0.4	0.0	0.0	0.0	0.1	1.3	8.2	10.6	45.6
Source 1: NOAA (snow/snow days 1981–2010)
Source 2: National Weather Service

== Culture and recreation ==
It is home to the Yellow Pine Harmonica Festival, which is held the first weekend in August of each year. It is located near Forest camp grounds, rivers and lakes. There are yearly snowmobile trips from Warm Lake to Yellow Pine with overnight accommodations.

The Frank Church Wilderness Area is known for its hiking trails. The community is surrounded by Unit 25 for elk, deer, bear, and cougar hunting.

== See also ==
- List of census-designated places in Idaho

== Additional reading ==
- Cox, Lafe & Emma. Idaho Mountains/Our Home, Life in the Idaho's Back County. VO Ranch Books, 1997.
- Sumner, Nancy. Yellow Pine, Idaho, (printed privately).
