= Idaho State Highway 57 =

State highway in the Idaho Panhandle

State Highway 57
- SH-57 highlighted in red

Route information
- Maintained by ITD
- Length: 37.230 mi (59.916 km)

Major junctions
- South end: US 2 in Priest River
- North end: FR 302 in Nordman

Location
- Country: United States
- State: Idaho
- Counties: Bonner

Highway system
- Idaho State Highway System; Interstate; US; State
← SH-55	→ SH-58

State Highway 57 (SH-57) is a 37.230-mile-long (59.916 km) state highway located entirely within Bonner County in the Idaho Panhandle region of the U.S. state of Idaho. SH-57 runs from U.S. Route 2 (US 2) in Priest River north to the end of state maintenance in Nordman. The highway is maintained by the Idaho Transportation Department.

== Route description ==
SH-57 begins at a junction with US 2 in western Priest River. The highway heads north as 9th Street through a mixed business and residential area and passes Priest River Municipal Airport and Priest River Lamanna High School. After leaving Priest River to the north, the route enters a forested area and begins to follow the Priest River. When the river turns eastward, the highway curves northward and passes an intersection with McAbee Falls Road. The road heads northwest on a winding path before turning north again to follow Moores Creek through the Kaniksu National Forest. At the 22-mile (35 km) mark, the route intersects Coolin Road, which heads east to serve the community of Coolin. Here SH-57 begins to follow the Priest River again, which it parallels until the river's source at Priest Lake. The highway passes through Outlet Bay at the southern edge of Priest Lake and follows the western edge of the lake northward, serving Lamb Creek and Vans Corner. After passing the Priest Lake USFS Airport, the road heads north toward Nordman. In Nordman, SH-57 intersects Reeder Creek Road before terminating at an intersection with Worden Lane; the highway continues as Nordman Road (FR 302) until a junction with Forest Service Road 311 (FR 311). The road then continues through the Washington border as Forest Service Road 302 (FR 302).

== Major intersections ==
The entire route is in Bonner County.

Location	mi	km	Destinations	Notes
Priest River	0.00	0.00	US 2	Southern terminus
Nordman	37.23	59.92	FR 302 (Nordman Road)	Northern terminus
1.000 mi = 1.609 km; 1.000 km = 0.621 mi
