= Outlet Bay, Idaho =

Unincorporated community in the state of Idaho, United States

- Unincorporated community
- Location within Idaho Location within the United States
- Coordinates: 48°29′40″N 116°53′36″W
- Country: United States
- State: Idaho
- County: Bonner
- Elevation: 2,474 ft (754 m)
- Time zone: UTC-8 (Pacific (PST))
  - Summer (DST): UTC-7 (PDT)
- Area codes: 208, 986
- GNIS feature ID: 396993

Outlet Bay is an unincorporated community in Bonner County, Idaho, United States. Outlet Bay is located on the southwest shore of Priest Lake, 21 miles (34 km) north of Priest River. The community is served by Idaho State Highway 57.
