= U.S. Route 2 in Idaho =

Section of U.S. Highway in Idaho

U.S. Highway 2
- Albeni Highway; Dover Highway
- US 2 highlighted in red

Route information
- Maintained by ITD
- Length: 80.152 mi (128.992 km)
- Tourist routes: Part of the International Selkirk Loop

Major junctions
- West end: US 2 / SH-41 at the Washington state line in Oldtown
- US 95 from Sandpoint to Bonners Ferry
- East end: US 2 at the Montana state line near Moyie Springs

Location
- Country: United States
- State: Idaho
- Counties: Bonner, Boundary

Highway system
- United States Numbered Highway System; List; Special; Divided; Idaho State Highway System; Interstate; US; State
← SH-1	→ SH-3

U.S. Highway 2 (US-2) is a United States Numbered Highway in the U.S. state of Idaho. It extends 80.152 miles (128.992 km) from the Washington state line and State Highway 41 (SH-41) in Oldtown, east to the Montana state line near Moyie Springs.

== Route description ==
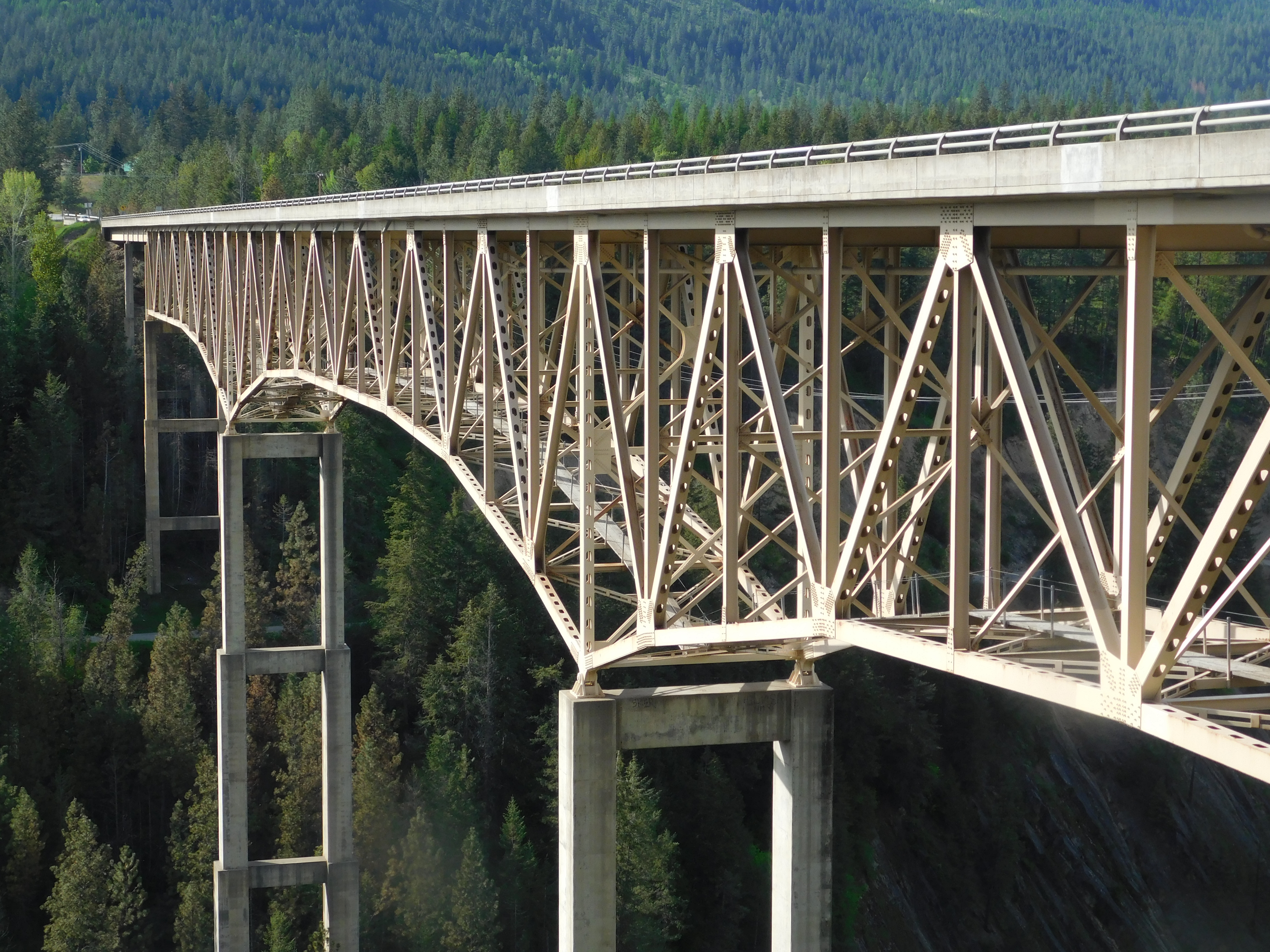
US-2's bridge over the Moyie River

US-2 enters Idaho at the Washington state line in Oldtown, intersecting SH-41 at the state line. It heads east out of Oldtown, crossing the Pend Oreille River, and continues east to Priest River. In Priest River, it intersects SH-57 and continues east across the Priest River. It then continues east along the Pend Oreille River past a marker for the Seneacquoteen historic site. It then turns east and northeast along the river through Dover into Sandpoint, where it overlaps US-95.

The overlapping highways then turn north into Ponderay, where they intersect SH-200 and continue north and northeast into Boundary County.

In Boundary County, they continue north and northeast into Bonners Ferry, where they cross the Kootenai River, continue north, and end their overlap near Boundary County Airport. US-2 then turns east past the airport and continues through Moyie Springs and across the Moyie River before turning southeast along the Kootenai River to the Montana state line, where it exits the state.

== History ==
US-2 was created in 1925 as part of the original system of U.S. Highways. Its original western terminus was in Bonners Ferry. In 1946, the highway was extended west to Everett, Washington, with the Idaho section taking its current route.

== Major intersections ==
County	Location	mi	km	Destinations	Notes
Idaho–Washington line		0.000	0.000	US 2 west (Walnut Street) – Newport, Spokane	Continuation into Newport, Washington
Idaho–Washington line		0.000	0.000	SH-41 south (State Avenue) – Spirit Lake, Coeur d'Alene	Northern terminus of SH-41
Bonner	Priest River	5.846	9.408	SH-57 north – Priest Lake	
Bonner	Ponderay	29.806	47.968	US 95 south – Coeur d'Alene, Spokane SH-200 east – Clark Fork	Interchange with US 95; west end of US 95 overlap
Boundary	Threemile Corner	64.350	103.561	US 95 north – Canada	East end of US 95 overlap
Boundary		80.184	129.044	US 2 east – Kalispell	Continuation into Montana
1.000 mi = 1.609 km; 1.000 km = 0.621 mi: Concurrency terminus

U.S. Route 2
Previous state: Washington	Idaho	Next state: Montana
