= Colbourn =

Colbourn is a surname. Notable people with the surname include:

- Charles Colbourn (born 1953), Canadian computer scientist and mathematician
- Trevor Colbourn (1927–2015), Australian academic and President of the University of Central Florida

== See also ==
- Colburn (Surname)
- Colbourne (Surname)
