= Gore Mutual Insurance Company =

Canadian property and casualty insurer

- Type: Mutual Insurance
- Industry: Insurance
- Founded: 1839; 187 years ago in Brantford, Ontario
- Headquarters: Cambridge, Ontario, Canada
- Key people: Andy Taylor (President and CEO), Paul Jackson (Chief Operating Officer)
- Net income: ▲13,200,000 CAD (Sept 2016)
- Number of employees: 450 employees across Canada (2014)
- Website: www.goremutual.ca

Gore Mutual Insurance Company is a Canadian property and casualty mutual insurer founded in 1839, making it one of the oldest insurers of its kind in Canada. Headquartered in Cambridge, Ontario, with additional offices in Toronto and Vancouver, it provides personal and commercial insurance products—including home, auto, and business coverage—through a network of independent brokers.

In 2019 the company launched a multi-year transformation program called Next Horizon, aimed at modernizing its technology and operating model and expanding Gore Mutual's national presence and broker/customer services. As of the end of 2022, Gore Mutual reported gross written premiums of approximately CAD $670 million and noted an adjusted combined operating ratio of 97.3% (adjusted for transformation investments). The company also operates the Gore Mutual Foundation, which funds community and charitable initiatives across Canada.

== History ==
=== Pre-Canadian Confederation (–1867) ===
After a failed attempt in 1837, Gore Mutual Insurance, known at that time as "The Gore District Mutual Fire Insurance Company", was created by an unknown businessman from Brantford, Ontario, on June 18, 1839, after rediscovering the subscription book that was originally created in 1837. Gore Mutual began business with only one paid officer, William A. Walker, who also held the role of secretary-treasurer. In November 1839, William A. Walker was also given the title of traveling agent. He was responsible for traveling on horseback in order to expand Gore Mutual's operations across the Galt district. With the passing of the new legislature in 1842, mutual insurance companies were able to expand their business into districts where no mutual fire insurance provider existed. Gore Mutual took advantage of this by expanding into Toronto, Simcoe, Oakville, Port Dover, Colbourne, Yarmouth, and London over a two-year period.

At the annual meeting in 1858, members authorized the board to reward fire companies that were called to assist with fires and those that successfully saved the property. This new legislation was the first step in developing more efficient firefighting methods in the Galt region.

==== 1860s modernization ====
The 1860s were a modernization period for Gore Mutual. Under new leadership in 1863, Gore Mutual moved the company to a new office building in Galt, Ontario. In 1865, Gore Mutual implemented a new structure for charging tariffs that allowed the company to charge higher premiums on policies that were deemed high-risk, a method that many insurance companies use today. In 1866, new agencies were established in Preston, St. Mary's, Wroxeter, Lucknow, Princeton, Plattsville, the County of Wentworth, the County of Halton, Embro, West Zorra, Woodstock, Brantford, and its surrounding counties.

=== Post-Confederation (1870–1939) ===
By mid-1870, the number of active Gore Mutual policies had grown to over 6,000, and the company had expanded into Central and Eastern Ontario.

In the late 1870s, Gore Mutual started to cancel policies that were deemed too high a risk. Gore Mutual also began breaking ties with agencies that were in remote areas that were located too far from the head office in Galt. By the beginning of the 1880s, Gore Mutual had over 4,500 policies; by 1899, that number had grown to over 13,000 policies. Gore Mutual's portfolio was growing at a rate of 500 policies a year. The value of its insured properties during that time rose from $4,000,000 in 1880 to $15,670,000 in 1899. Meanwhile, British and American fire and casualty insurance companies began expanding into Canada during this time.

In 1895, Gore Mutual's new building in Galt was completed. The building stands over 80 feet tall and was built with dark red bricks and sandstone trim. It is revolutionary with hot water heating as well as gas and electrical lighting. The building quickly emerged as a local landmark for the people of Galt.

In 1914, Gore Mutual donated $50,000, which was the previous year's profits, to help aid the War Effort Patriotic Fund.

In 1936, Gore Mutual's current building was completed. Built by Scottish stonemasons using local, handpicked stone, it was built on a hilltop surrounded by gardens. Lieutenant-Governor Herbert A. Bruce officially opened the building.

In 1939, Gore Mutual turned 100 years old and had over 2.4 million dollars CAD in assets.

=== World War 2 and Post War ===
During World War II, Gore Mutual donated $100,000 of its profits to the government of Canada in order to aid the war effort. This money was to be spent however the government saw fit. Not only did Gore Mutual donate to the cause, but every employee gave an additional portion of their income during the war to further aid the efforts of the Canadian troops. During this time, eight Gore Mutual employees served, all of whom survived; however, two of them were severely wounded during their time of service. By the end of the war, Gore Mutual had victory bonds amounting to a total of $525,000, which is worth roughly $7,297,550 today.

In the early 1970s, Gore Mutual hired Brantford architects Mark Musselman, McIntyre & Combe to design a new building that was to be attached to the existing head office, built in 1937. The two buildings are connected by a glass passageway that extends 60 feet from the old to the new building.

In 1968, Gore Mutual purchased its first Honeywell Computer, becoming one of the first companies in Canada to use computerized policy handling for automobile insurance. The late 1970s were the age of computers for Gore Mutual. Cathode Ray Tube (CRT) systems were used in the claims department for the purpose of processing personal and commercial lines. In the 1990s, Gore Mutual introduced a 24-hour emergency claims service in order to help customers and brokers at all times. Also during this time, new estimating software was introduced to allow adjusters to prepare quotes with greater speed and accuracy. In 1998 Gore Mutual created the Gore Mutual Foundation. The foundation provides funding for hundreds of health, welfare, education, cultural, environmental, and charitable activities in communities across Canada.

=== Paperless Office in 2002 ===
In 2002, Gore Mutual Insurance implemented a paperless office objective. The quick success of the paperless movement was credited to Gore Mutual staff being under the age of 35. Gore Mutual's success in implementing a paperless office has inspired some insurance brokerages to also turn their offices into paperless offices.

== Gore Mutual Insurance Foundation ==
Gore Mutual has been donating to charities in the communities where they do business for over 100 years. In 1998, Gore Mutual incorporated the Gore Mutual Insurance Foundation, registered as a private charity funding statute, which has the benefit of being tax-free and allowing for an increase in yearly donations.

Since 1998, the Gore Mutual Foundation has donated over $12 million to nearly 1,000 charities. In 2008, the Foundation donated $500,000 to the Cambridge Memorial Hospital.

In 2011, the Gore Mutual Foundation donated $450,000 to nearly 120 charities across Canada. In 2012, Gore Mutual pledged $1 million to the Gore Mutual Foundation. In 2020, CanadaHelps, in partnership with the Gore Mutual Foundation, doubled the donations made by others towards COVID-19 relief efforts. Each donation to the CanadaHelps COVID-19 Cause Funds was doubled by the Gore Mutual Foundation, which committed $2 million in matching funds to be split between the COVID-19 Community Care Fund and the COVID-19 Healthcare and Hospital Fund.
