= Williston Congregational Church =

Historic church in Vermont, United States

- U.S. National Register of Historic Places
- U.S. Historic district – Contributing property
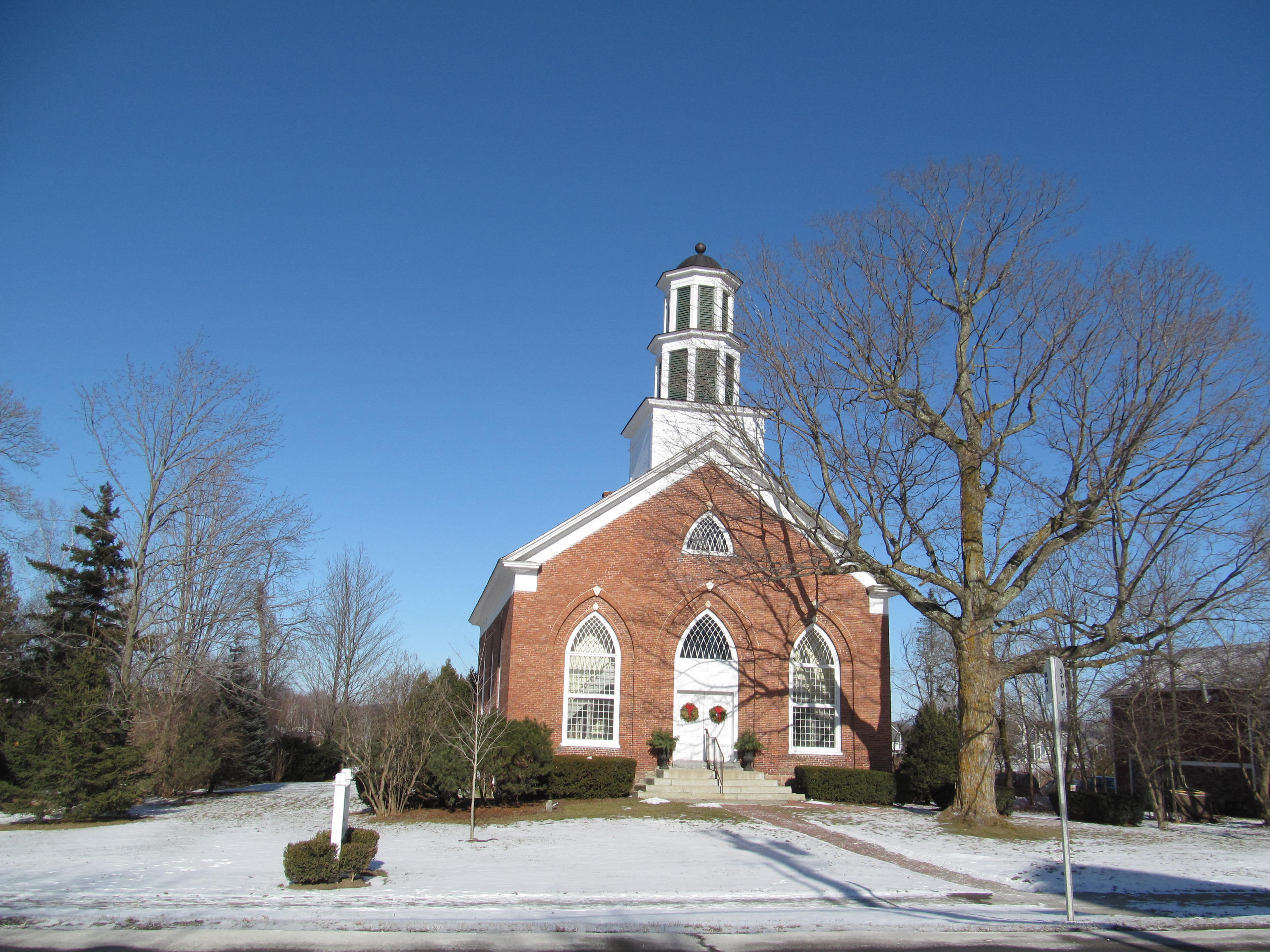

- Location within Vermont Location within the United States
- Location: Center of Williston Village on VT 2, Williston, Vermont
- Coordinates: 44°26′20″N 73°4′23″W
- Area: less than one acre
- Built: 1832
- Architectural style: Gothic Revival
- Part of: Williston Village Historic District (ID79000222)
- NRHP reference No.: 73000194

Significant dates
- Added to NRHP: May 17, 1973
- Designated CP: December 19, 1979

Williston Congregational Church is a historic church in the center of Williston Village on United States Route 2 in Williston, Vermont. Built in 1832 and the interior restyled in 1860, this brick church is a fine local example of Gothic Revival architecture. It was listed on the National Register of Historic Places in 1973.

== Description and history ==
The Williston Congregational Church is set prominently in the village center of Williston, on the north side of US 2, opposite the town hall. It is a single-story brick structure, with a gabled roof and redstone foundation. A three-stage wood-frame tower rises from the roof ridge, with a square first stage, and two louvered octagonal stages capped by a cupola. The front facade is three bays wide, each defined by a recessed Gothic-arched brick panel. The outer bays house windows, and the center one houses the main entrance. A gothic arched window, is set in the gable above the entrance. Similar windows are found on the sides of the building. The interior has a large chamber with a gallery at the rear. The walls are lined with windows articulated by pilasters, and it has a flat ceiling, with a heavy plaster cornice and elaborate molded chandelier medallion in the center of the ceiling.

The church was built in 1832 for a congregation founded in 1800. Its interior is the result of an 1860 remodeling. The bell was manufactured in 1878 by the Troy Foundry Bell Works of Troy, New York. The church was closed and shuttered in 1899 and remained so until 1963 when a movement was started by the youth of the town, led by Mark Hutchins, to open and restore it. A lightning strike in 2007 destroyed the upper two octagonal belfry tiers and the original bell. The belfry was duplicated and another period bell installed by the Town of Williston, which owns the building. A remodel of the basement and a small rear addition now provide bathroom, kitchen and meeting spaces for the public.

== See also ==
- National Register of Historic Places listings in Chittenden County, Vermont
