= Colborne =

Colborne may refer to:

== Places ==
- Ashfield-Colborne-Wawanosh, a municipality in Huron County, Ontario
- Colborne, Norfolk County, Ontario
- Colborne, Northumberland County, Ontario
- Colborne Parish, New Brunswick

== Other uses ==
- Colborne (surname), a surname
