= Lamb Creek, Idaho =

Unincorporated community in the state of Idaho, United States

- Unincorporated community
- Location within Idaho Location within the United States
- Coordinates: 48°30′59″N 116°55′39″W
- Country: United States
- State: Idaho
- County: Bonner
- Elevation: 2,556 ft (779 m)
- Time zone: UTC-8 (Pacific (PST))
  - Summer (DST): UTC-7 (PDT)
- Area codes: 208, 986
- GNIS feature ID: 396762

Lamb Creek is an unincorporated community in Bonner County, Idaho, United States. Lamb Creek is located on Idaho State Highway 57 23.2 miles (37.3 km) north of Priest River.
