= Laclede, Idaho =

Unincorporated community in the state of Idaho, United States

- Unincorporated community
- Location within Idaho Location within the United States
- Coordinates: 48°10′07″N 116°44′52″W
- Country: United States
- State: Idaho
- County: Bonner
- Elevation: 2,097 ft (639 m)

Population (2020)
  - Total: 434
- Time zone: UTC-8 (Pacific (PST))
  - Summer (DST): UTC-7 (PDT)
- ZIP code: 83841
- Area codes: 208, 986
- GNIS feature ID: 2804062

Laclede is an unincorporated community and census-designated place in Bonner County, Idaho, United States. Laclede is located on U.S. Route 2 at the intersection of Riley Creek and the Pend Oreille (pronounced Pond O'Ray) River. Laclede has a post office with ZIP code 83841. The population at the 2020 census was 434.

Laclede is surrounded by forested lands. The Riley Creek Recreation Area and Pend Oreille Wildlife Management Area lie one mile (1.6 km) SW of Laclede. The Laclede Mill, a part of the Idaho Forest Group, is in Laclede, producing Douglas fir, Cedar, and White Pine woods for export worldwide.

== History ==
A post office called Laclede has been in operation since 1901. The community bears the name of a French Canadian pioneer, Pierre Laclède,

Laclede's population was estimated at 150 in 1909, and was also 150 in 1960. By the 2020 census, the population was 434.

== Education ==
Children in the community attend Priest River schools.
