= Williston Village Historic District =

Historic district in Vermont, United States

- U.S. National Register of Historic Places
- U.S. Historic district
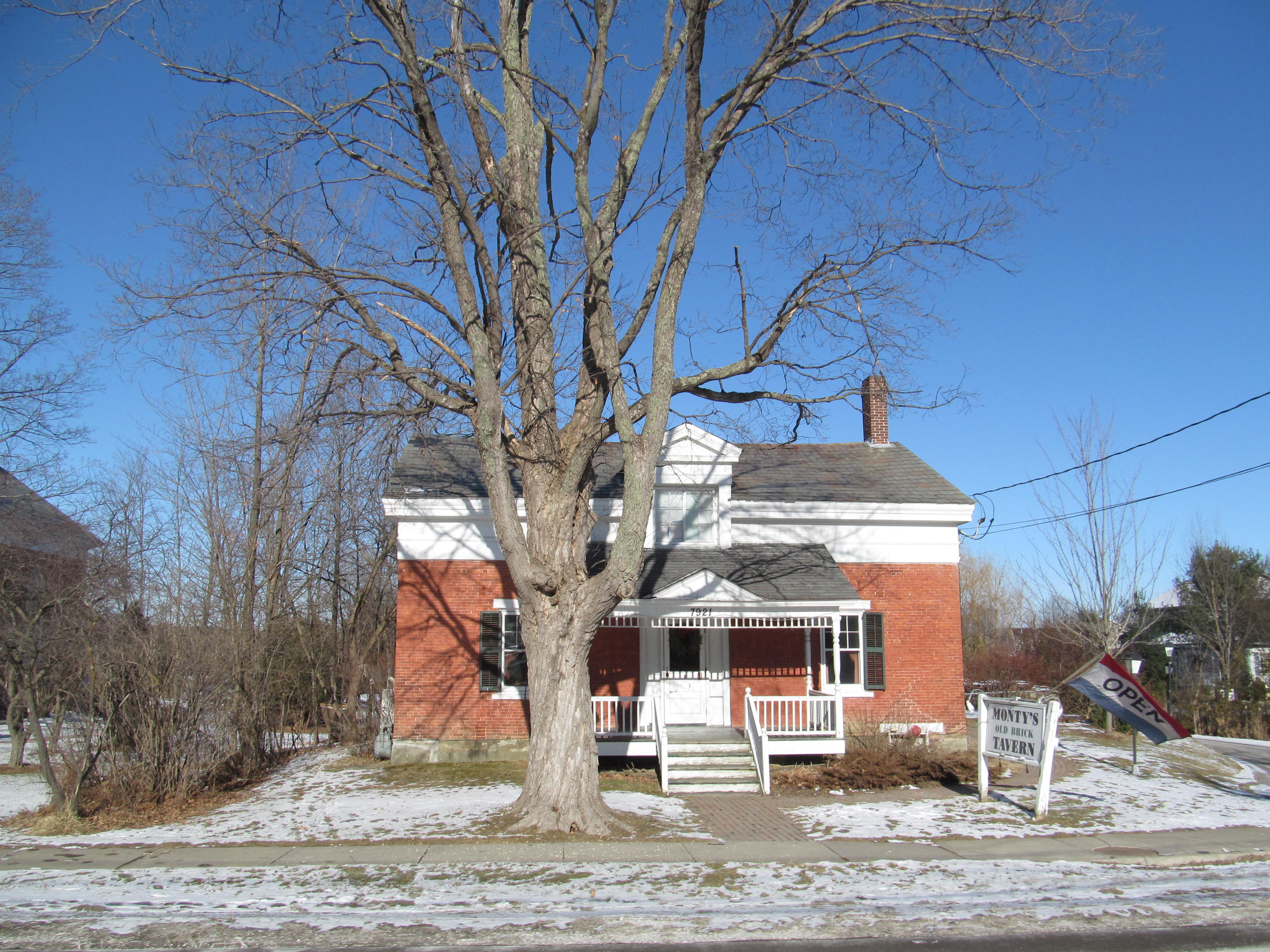

- Location within Vermont Location within the United States
- Location: U.S. 2, Williston, Vermont
- Coordinates: 44°26′16″N 73°4′14″W
- Area: 19 acres (7.7 ha)
- Architectural style: Greek Revival, Federal
- NRHP reference No.: 79000222 (original); 92001151 (increase)

Significant dates
- Added to NRHP: December 19, 1979
- Boundary increase: September 4, 1992

The Williston Village Historic District encompasses the village center of Williston, Vermont. The predominantly rural community is home to a well-preserved array of Federal and Greek Revival buildings, constructed mainly in the first half of the 19th century. The district was listed on the National Register of Historic Places in 1979, with a minor enlargement in 1992.

== Description and history ==
The town of Williston has had a long history as a primarily agrarian community, from its earliest settlement in the late 18th century. The town center arose at this location, in part as a stagecoach stop on the Williston Turnpike, opened in 1805 between Burlington and Montpelier. Now United States Route 2, it was the major route between these two cities until Interstate 89 was built in the 1960s. The town also benefited from nearby Allen Brook, whose waters powered sawmills and tanneries at the eastern end of the village. The town was generally prosperous in its agriculture, resulting in a fine collection of architecture built between about 1800 and 1860.

The historic district is visually anchored at its western end by a cluster of brick buildings, the 1832 Williston Congregational Church dominating. It extends eastward to where US 2 crosses Allen Brook, including a c. 1896 pedestrian bridge that is one of the oldest known concrete bridges in the state. Several of the houses in the district were built by members of the politically prominent Chittenden family; Thomas Chittenden was an important figure in Vermont's drive for statehood, and was its first governor. He was one of Williston's first settlers, and his son and grandson both lived here. Non-residential buildings in the district include four churches and two former taverns. None of the village's 19th-century industrial infrastructure survives, although archaeological remains may be present along Allen Brook.

== See also ==
- National Register of Historic Places listings in Chittenden County, Vermont
