= Vans Corner, Idaho =

Unincorporated community in the state of Idaho, United States

- Unincorporated community
- Location within Idaho Location within the United States
- Coordinates: 48°31′31″N 116°56′20″W
- Country: United States
- State: Idaho
- County: Bonner
- Elevation: 2,569 ft (783 m)
- Time zone: UTC-8 (Pacific (PST))
  - Summer (DST): UTC-7 (PDT)
- Area codes: 208, 986
- GNIS feature ID: 397293

Vans Corner is an unincorporated community in Bonner County, Idaho, United States. Vans Corner is located on Idaho State Highway 57 23.8 miles (38.3 km) north of Priest River.
