= Nordman, Idaho =

Unincorporated community in the state of Idaho, United States

- Unincorporated community
- Location within Idaho Location within the United States
- Coordinates: 48°38′02″N 116°56′45″W
- Country: United States
- State: Idaho
- County: Bonner
- Elevation: 2,628 ft (801 m)
- Time zone: UTC-8 (Pacific (PST))
  - Summer (DST): UTC-7 (PDT)
- ZIP code: 83848
- Area codes: 208, 986
- GNIS feature ID: 397948

Nordman is an unincorporated community in Bonner County, Idaho, United States. Nordman is located near Idaho State Highway 57 31 miles (50 km) north of Priest River. Nordman has a post office with ZIP code 83848.
