= Sagle, Idaho =

Unincorporated community in the state of Idaho, United States

- Unincorporated community
- Nicknames: south of town, the south side
- Motto: Never forget the land of 7B
- Location within Idaho Location within the United States
- Coordinates: 48°12′09″N 116°32′52″W
- Country: United States
- State: Idaho
- County: Bonner
- Elevation: 2,149 ft (655 m)
- Time zone: UTC-8 (Pacific (PST))
  - Summer (DST): UTC-7 (PDT)
- ZIP code: 83860
- Area codes: 208, 986
- GNIS feature ID: 389817

Sagle is an unincorporated community in Bonner County, Idaho, located 5 miles (8.0 km) south of Sandpoint. Sagle has a post office with ZIP code 83860.

Sagle has an elementary school that lies on Sagle Road, just off the main highway. The mascot of Sagle Elementary is the Hawks. The Sagle area has recently seen an expansion of businesses and commerce as it lies close to the population base in Sandpoint, features major highway frontage, and has fewer regulations and restrictions than nearby Sandpoint.

== Climate ==
Sagle generally features long cool winters with substantial precipitation. Most precipitation in the winter months occurs as snow, although it is standard to get one or two days in the winter which can lead to rain and snowmelt. Winters generally feature snowfall on the ground from late November until early March, although snow can fall in October and can linger into April and May, most recently in the winter of 2007–2008.

Summers in Sagle are generally sunny from June until September with temperatures consistently ranging from the low 80s °F (20s °C) to the mid 90s °F (30s °C), although temperatures of 100 °F (38 °C) are not unheard of. Winters are snowy, and there can be weeks without seeing the sun. Average annual precipitation ranges from 30 inches (760 mm) to 35 inches (890 mm), depending on the specific area within Sagle and local geography.

== Geography ==
Sagle is characterized by low, rolling hills bordered by larger mountains. The vast majority of the population live along the valley floor or among the low hills that dot the region. However, there are some who live farther back in the mountains. There are two main mountain ranges, one flanking the west of Sagle and one flanking the east. Both ranges run roughly north to south. The western range consists of Ott's Basin, the Dufort area, and runs south toward Huckleberry and Long Mountains. The eastern mountains are more prominent and form a chain from Gold Hill southward for nearly 30 miles (48 km) all the way to Cape Horn near Bayview, Idaho. The only major road that crosses this eastern chain is Sagle Road, which noticeably climbs steadily until a steep hill winds down toward Lake Pend Oreille and the small resort town of Garfield Bay. These mountains feature sightings of deer, elk, moose, and turkeys very common. Bears, cougars, and even the occasional wolf are sometimes observed in this chain. The flora features a wide variety of trees, from the western larch and ponderosa pine to the western red cedar and western hemlock. Additionally, Huckleberry patches are widespread throughout these hills.

== Education ==
Most children in the area attend Sagle Elementary School, which often functions as a hub of the community. Sagle does not have its own high school and is a part of the larger Lake Pend Oreille School District. Teenagers attend Sandpoint Middle School for grades 7-8 and Sandpoint High School for grades 9-12.
