= Old Northern Inn =

Pub in northern Idaho

Coordinates: 48.47797°N 116.85011°W

The Northern Inn, early 1900s

The Old Northern Inn is the oldest hostelry in northern Idaho. Located on Priest Lake in Coolin, Idaho, the two-story log hotel was built in 1900 by Walt Williams, an employee of the Great Northern Railroad. One of a number of lodges created to attract more passengers to the rail line, the Northern Inn is the only one that remains from the early days of Idaho statehood when mining, timber, and tourism businesses were beginning to develop around Priest Lake.

== History ==
The Northern Hotel was purchased in 1917 by Ida Handy, who had already made a successful business with another hotel, the Idaho Inn. For more than twenty years, Ida Handy oversaw one of the most successful tourist operations at Priest Lake.

Fred Forsythe ran the hotel during World War II as the Hillcrest Lodge, selling it after the war to the Staples family, who promoted the lake's “only complete lodge with cocktail lounge.” In the 1960s, 70s, and 80s, the historic building went through several incarnations as a boarding house, bar, and restaurant under the various names of Dyer's Resort, Houdini's, Capt Eddy's and Eduardo's.

In the early 1990s, after sitting empty for seven years, the 90-year-old building was purchased by Phil Battaglia, former chief of staff for Governor Reagan. With his wife Lorraine, Phil restored the old hotel into a bed and breakfast.
