= Colburn, Idaho =

Unincorporated community in Idaho, United States

- Unincorporated community
- Location within Idaho Location within the United States
- Coordinates: 48°23′50″N 116°32′07″W
- Country: United States
- State: Idaho
- County: Bonner
- Elevation: 2,172 ft (662 m)
- Time zone: UTC-8 (Pacific (PST))
  - Summer (DST): UTC-7 (PDT)
- ZIP code: 83865
- Area codes: 208, 986
- GNIS feature ID: 396316

Colburn is an unincorporated community in Bonner County, Idaho, United States. Colburn is located on U.S. Route 2 and U.S. Route 95 8.5 miles (13.7 km) north of Sandpoint. Colburn has a post office with ZIP code 83865.

== History ==
Colburn's population was 50 in 1960.
