= Colburn =

Colburn may refer to:

== Places ==
=== United Kingdom ===
- Colburn, North Yorkshire

=== United States ===
- Colburn, Idaho
- Colburn, Indiana
- Colburn, St. Joseph County, Indiana
- Colburn, Adams County, Wisconsin
- Colburn, Chippewa County, Wisconsin
- Colburn (community), Wisconsin

== Other uses ==
- Colburn (surname)
- Colburn Automobile Company, Denver, Colorado
- Colburn School, a music conservatory and performing arts school in Los Angeles

== See also ==
- Coalburn, a village in South Lanarkshire, Scotland
