= Careywood, Idaho =

Unincorporated community in the state of Idaho, United States

- Unincorporated community
- Location within Idaho Location within the United States
- Coordinates: 48°02′05″N 116°38′36″W
- Country: United States
- State: Idaho
- County: Bonner
- Elevation: 2,280 ft (690 m)
- Time zone: UTC-8 (Pacific (PST))
  - Summer (DST): UTC-7 (PDT)
- ZIP code: 83809
- Area codes: 208, 986
- GNIS feature ID: 396235

Careywood is an unincorporated community in Bonner County, Idaho, United States. Careywood is located on U.S. Route 95 6.5 miles (10.5 km) north-northeast of Athol. Careywood had a post office with ZIP code 83809 which closed in 2015.

== History ==
Originally known as Severance, the town was renamed Careywood after a man named Carey from Spokane who bought land in the area. At the time, Careywood was involved in the logging industry. Careywood's population was 25 in 1960.

== Climate ==
This region experiences warm (but not hot) and dry summers, with no average monthly temperatures above 71.6 °F. According to the Köppen Climate Classification system, Careywood has a warm-summer Mediterranean climate, abbreviated "Csb" on climate maps.
