= Westmond, Idaho =

Unincorporated community in the state of Idaho, United States

- Unincorporated community
- Location within Idaho Location within the United States
- Coordinates: 48°08′24″N 116°36′13″W
- Country: United States
- State: Idaho
- County: Bonner
- Elevation: 2,215 ft (675 m)
- Time zone: UTC-8 (Pacific (PST))
  - Summer (DST): UTC-7 (PDT)
- Area codes: 208, 986
- GNIS feature ID: 398341

Westmond is an unincorporated community in Bonner County, Idaho, United States. Westmond is located on the north shore of Cocolalla Lake along U.S. Route 95, 9.7 miles (15.6 km) south-southwest of Sandpoint.
