= Colbourne =

Colbourne is a surname. Notable people with the surname include:

- Bill Colbourne (1895–1979), Australian political organizer and trade unionist
- Mark Colbourne (born 1969), Welsh Paralympic cyclist
- Maurice Colbourne (1894–1965), English actor
- Maurice Colbourne (1939–1989), English actor

== See also ==
- Colborne (surname)
