= Coolin, Idaho =

Census-designated place in Bonner County, Idaho, United States

- Census-designated place
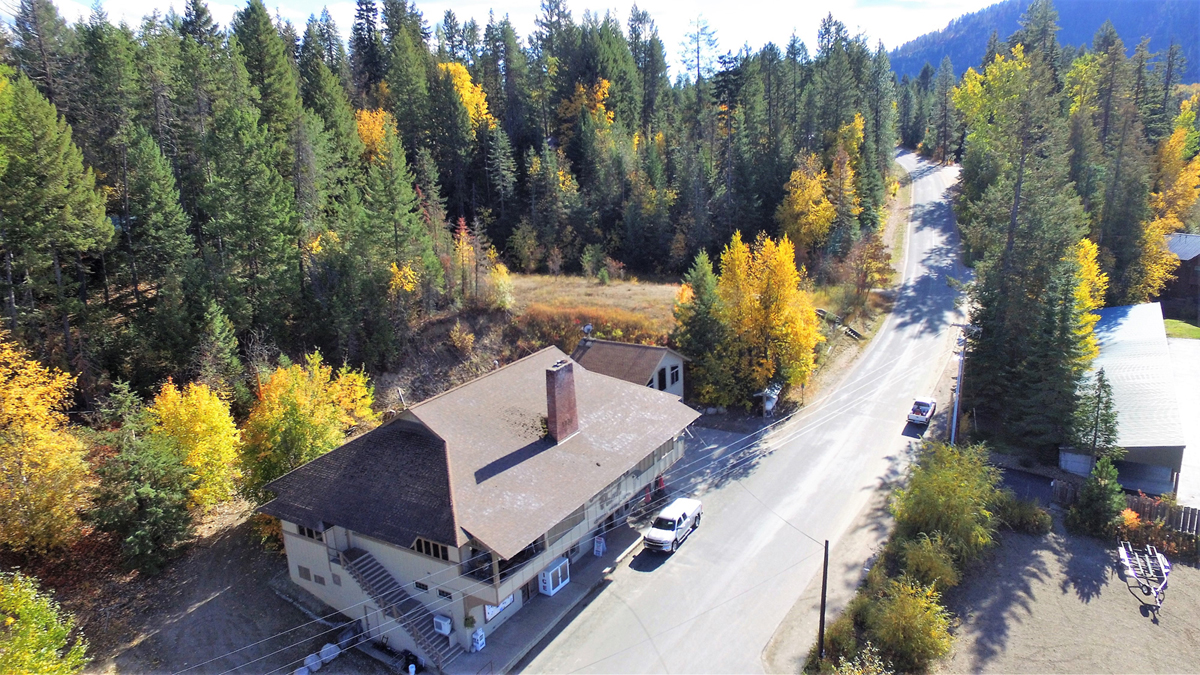
- Coolin, March 2020

- Location within Idaho Location within the United States
- Coordinates: 48°28′34″N 116°50′38″W
- Country: United States
- State: Idaho
- County: Bonner
- Elevation: 2,526 ft (770 m)

Population (2020)
  - Total: 138
- GNIS feature ID: 2804061

Coolin is an unincorporated community in Bonner County, Idaho, United States. The nearest school district is the West Bonner School District. The population was 138 at the 2020 census.

== Geography ==
Coolin is situated at the southeast end of Priest Lake, at an elevation is 2,490 feet above sea level.

=== Climate ===
This climatic region is typified by large seasonal temperature differences, with warm to hot (and often humid) summers and cold (sometimes severely cold) winters. According to the Köppen Climate Classification system, Coolin has a humid continental climate, abbreviated "Dfb" on climate maps.

== History ==
Andy Coolin opened a post office at the southern end of Priest Lake in 1893, thereby giving his name to the nascent community. Hopes were high for a mining bonanza in the area and for a future link to the railroad, 28 miles away. To accommodate travelers and prospectors, Walt Williams, an employee of the Great Northern Railroad, built a two-story log hotel, the Northern Inn, in 1900.

In 1903 Andy Coolin received a patent on a homestead, planning to leverage his land into a financial empire. Coolin formed the Priest Lake Town Site and Improvement Company with his brother and other local investors in 1907. By that time Spokane businessman Joseph Slee already operated a steamboat out of Coolin connecting the lake with supplies, mail, and transportation. In 1906, Leonard Paul opened a general merchandise store in the tiny village; Ida Handy opened the Idaho Inn in 1908.

When mining riches failed to pan out and Andy Coolin's efforts to lure the railway to Priest Lake came to naught, the village of Coolin became a center for summer vacationers and services, including a sawmill, store, hotel, ranger station, docks, and steamboat service. Today the Old Northern Inn, the Leonard Paul Store, and the one room schoolhouse, built in 1916 and now the Coolin Civic Association, remain as landmarks from those early days.

Coolin's population was estimated at 100 in 1960.

== Politics ==
Presidential election results

Previous presidential election results
| Year | Republican | Democratic | Third parties |
|---|---|---|---|
| 2020 | 62.9% 73 | 33.6% 39 | 3.4% 4 |
| 2016 | 57.7% 31 | 37.2% 20 | 5.1% 3 |

Statewide election results

Previous statewide election results
| Year | Republican | Democratic | Third parties |
|---|---|---|---|
| 2020 Senate | 65.2% 75 | 33% 38 | 1.7% 2 |
| 2018 Governor | 56.8% 29 | 41.9% 21 | 1.4% 1 |
| 2018 Lt. Governor | 54.4% 28 | 45.6% 23 | 0% 0 |
| 2018 Attorney General | 55.2% 27 | 44.8% 22 | 0% 0 |
| 2016 Senate | 61.6% 33 | 35.8% 19 | 2.5% 1 |

== See also ==
- List of census-designated places in Idaho
