= Bonner County, Idaho =

County in Idaho, United States

- County
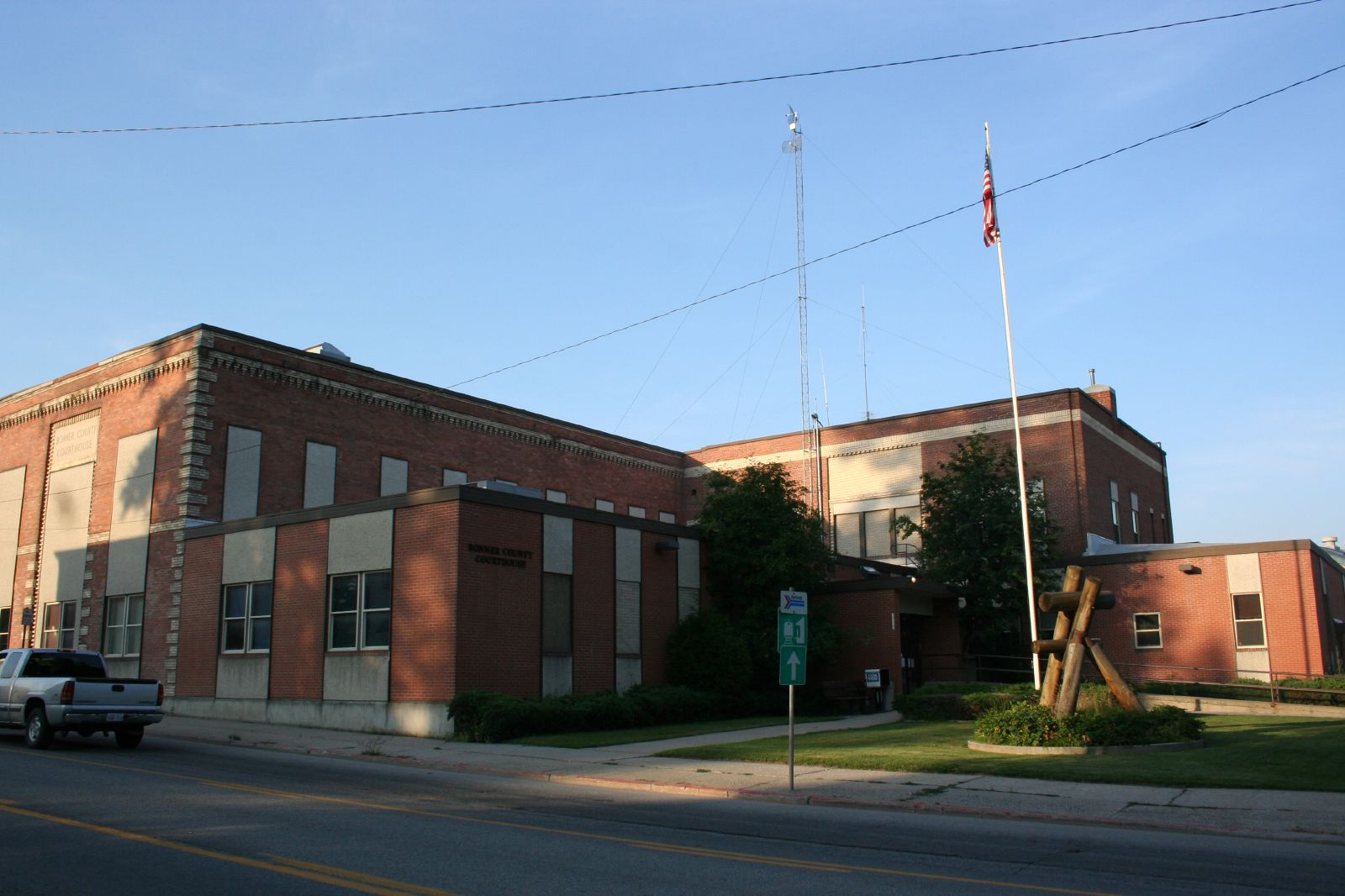
- Bonner County Courthouse in Sandpoint

- Seal

- Location within the U.S. state of Idaho
- Coordinates: 48°17′N 116°36′W
- Country: United States
- State: Idaho
- Founded: February 21, 1907
- Named for: Edwin L. Bonner
- Seat: Sandpoint
- Largest city: Sandpoint

Area
  - Total: 1,919 sq mi (4,970 km^{2})
  - Land: 1,735 sq mi (4,490 km^{2})
  - Water: 185 sq mi (480 km^{2}) 9.6%

Population (2020)
  - Total: 47,110
  - Estimate (2025): 54,420 ▲
  - Density: 27.15/sq mi (10.48/km^{2})
- Time zone: UTC−8 (Pacific)
  - Summer (DST): UTC−7 (PDT)
- Congressional district: 1st
- Website: www.bonnercountyid.gov

Bonner County is a county in the northern part of the U.S. state of Idaho. As of the 2020 census, the population was 47,110. The county seat and largest city is Sandpoint. Partitioned from Kootenai County and established in 1907, it was named for Edwin L. Bonner, a ferry operator. Bonner County comprises the Sandpoint, Idaho Micropolitan Statistical Area.

== History ==
Bonner County was formed on February 21, 1907. It was named for travel entrepreneur Edwin L. Bonner, a ferry operator.

In 1864, the Idaho Legislature created the counties of Lah-Toh and Kootenai. Kootenai County initially covered all of present-day Bonner and Boundary counties and a portion of present-day Kootenai County. It also overlapped part of the existing boundary of Shoshone County. Sin-na-ac-qua-teen, a trading post in present-day Bonner County on the south shore of the Pend Oreille River near Laclede, was named county seat. The government of Kootenai failed to organize due to lack of settlement within the county boundary. In 1867, the legislature repealed the act that created the two counties and consolidated them into a county that retained the Kootenai name. Rathdrum became the county seat when Kootenai County organized in 1881.

The tiny portion of Bonner County south of the 48th parallel and east of Shoshone County was not in any of Idaho's counties from 1863 to 1907, the longest time frame any non-county area existed in the State of Idaho. The Idaho panhandle north of the Clearwater River's basin was in Spokane County, Washington, prior to Idaho's creation as a territory in 1863. When Idaho defined its original counties by February 1864, it attached the former Spokane County area to Nez Perce County for judicial purposes. Legislators creating Kootenai County in December 1864 lacked knowledge of the geography of the area and failed to fully include the non-county area within the county boundaries of Kootenai or Lah-Toh. The non-county area was fully included within Bonner County when it was formed in 1907.

Boundary County was formed from Bonner County in 1915.

== Geography ==
According to the U.S. Census Bureau, the county has a total area of 1,919 square miles (4,970 km^{2}), of which 1,735 square miles (4,490 km^{2}) is land and 185 square miles (480 km^{2}) (9.6%) is water. The highest point in the county is Scotchman Peak, elevation 7,018 feet (2,139 m).

=== Adjacent counties ===
- Pend Oreille County, Washington– northwest
- Boundary County – north
- Lincoln County, Montana – east/Mountain Time Border
- Sanders County, Montana – southeast/Mountain Time Border
- Shoshone County – southeast
- Kootenai County – south
- Spokane County, Washington – southwest

=== National protected areas ===
- Pacific Northwest National Scenic Trail (part)
- Coeur d'Alene National Forest (part)
- Kaniksu National Forest (part)
- Kootenai National Forest (part)

=== Major highways ===
- US 2
- US 95
- SH-41
- SH-57
- SH-200

=== Rivers and lakes ===
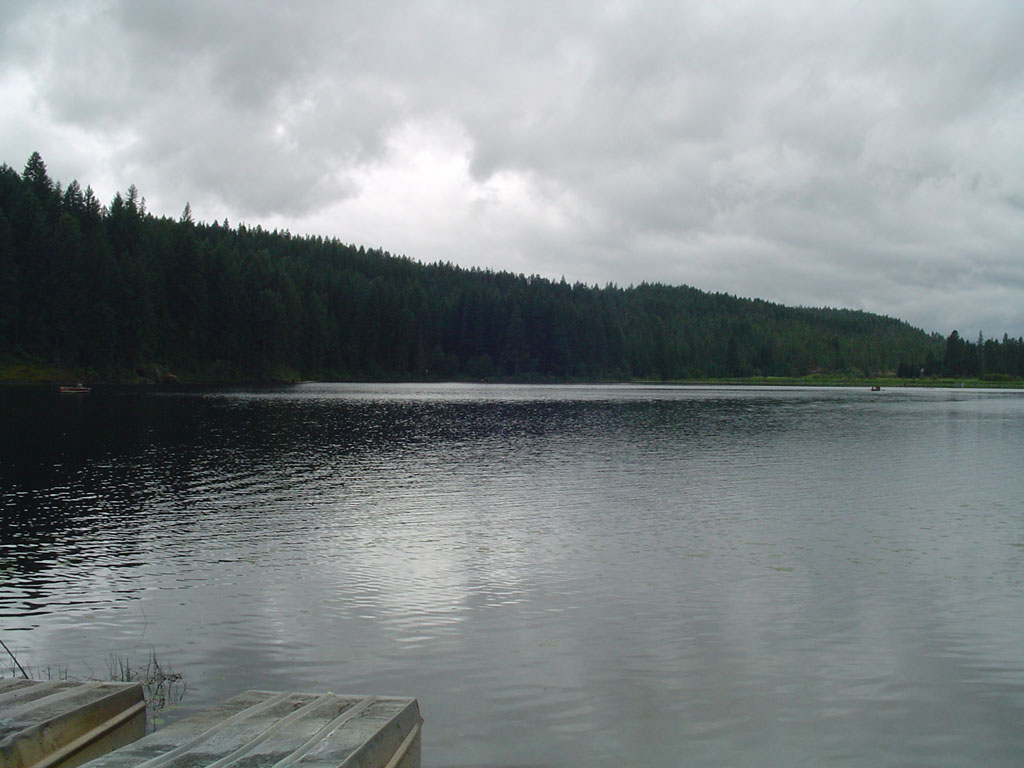
Kelso Lake

- Albeni Falls Dam
- Clark Fork River
- Cocolalla
- Kelso Lake
- Lake Pend Oreille
- Pack River
- Pend Oreille River
- Priest Lake

== Demographics ==
Historical population
Census	Pop.	Note	%±
1910	13,588		—
1920	12,957		−4.6%
1930	13,152		1.5%
1940	15,667		19.1%
1950	14,853		−5.2%
1960	15,587		4.9%
1970	15,560		−0.2%
1980	24,163		55.3%
1990	26,622		10.2%
2000	36,835		38.4%
2010	40,877		11.0%
2020	47,110		15.2%
2025 (est.)	54,420	▲	15.5%
U.S. Decennial Census; 1790–1960 1900–1990; 1990–2000 2010–2020

=== Racial and ethnic composition ===
Bonner County, Idaho – Racial and ethnic composition Note: the US Census treats Hispanic/Latino as an ethnic category. This table excludes Latinos from the racial categories and assigns them to a separate category. Hispanics/Latinos may be of any race.
Race / Ethnicity (NH = Non-Hispanic)	Pop 1980	Pop 1990	Pop 2000	Pop 2010	Pop 2020	% 1980	% 1990	% 2000	% 2010	% 2020
White alone (NH)	23,701	25,964	35,206	38,606	42,344	98.09%	97.53%	95.58%	94.44%	89.88%
Black or African American alone (NH)	24	34	38	51	115	0.10%	0.13%	0.10%	0.12%	0.24%
Native American or Alaska Native alone (NH)	130	204	292	290	307	0.54%	0.77%	0.79%	0.71%	0.65%
Asian alone (NH)	55	66	98	177	252	0.23%	0.25%	0.27%	0.43%	0.53%
Native Hawaiian or Pacific Islander alone (NH)	x	x	17	40	39	x	x	0.05%	0.10%	0.08%
Other race alone (NH)	31	2	28	35	295	0.13%	0.01%	0.08%	0.09%	0.63%
Mixed race or Multiracial (NH)	x	x	552	767	2,254	x	x	1.50%	1.88%	4.78%
Hispanic or Latino (any race)	222	352	604	911	1,504	0.92%	1.32%	1.64%	2.23%	3.19%
Total	24,163	26,622	36,835	40,877	47,110	100.00%	100.00%	100.00%	100.00%	100.00%

=== 2020 census ===
As of the 2020 census, the county had a population of 47,110. The median age was 49.3 years, 19.5% of residents were under the age of 18, and 26.3% were 65 years of age or older. For every 100 females there were 100.9 males, and for every 100 females age 18 and over there were 99.7 males age 18 and over.

The racial makeup of the county was 91.1% White, 0.3% Black or African American, 0.7% American Indian and Alaska Native, 0.5% Asian, 0.1% Native Hawaiian and Pacific Islander, 1.1% from some other race, and 6.1% from two or more races. Hispanic or Latino residents of any race comprised 3.2% of the population.

27.2% of residents lived in urban areas, while 72.8% lived in rural areas.

There were 19,619 households in the county, of which 23.8% had children under the age of 18 living with them and 20.3% had a female householder with no spouse or partner present. About 26.4% of all households were made up of individuals and 13.8% had someone living alone who was 65 years of age or older.

There were 26,312 housing units, of which 25.4% were vacant. Among occupied housing units, 76.4% were owner-occupied and 23.6% were renter-occupied. The homeowner vacancy rate was 1.4% and the rental vacancy rate was 6.9%.

=== 2010 census ===
As of the 2010 United States census, there were 40,877 people, 17,100 households, and 11,591 families living in the county. The population density was 23.6 inhabitants per square mile (9.1/km^{2}). There were 24,669 housing units at an average density of 14.2 units per square mile (5.5 units/km^{2}). The racial makeup of the county was 96.0% white, 0.8% American Indian, 0.5% Asian, 0.1% Pacific islander, 0.1% black or African American, 0.4% from other races, and 2.1% from two or more races. Those of Hispanic or Latino origin made up 2.2% of the population. In terms of ancestry, 25.4% were German, 15.3% were Irish, 15.2% were English, 6.2% were Norwegian, and 5.0% were American.

Of the 17,100 households, 27.2% had children under the age of 18 living with them, 55.3% were married couples living together, 7.9% had a female householder with no husband present, 32.2% were non-families, and 26.0% of all households were made up of individuals. The average household size was 2.37 and the average family size was 2.82. The median age was 45.8 years.

The median income for a household in the county was $41,943 and the median income for a family was $51,377. Males had a median income of $40,076 versus $30,829 for females. The per capita income for the county was $24,745. About 10.1% of families and 14.3% of the population were below the poverty line, including 22.3% of those under age 18 and 6.7% of those age 65 or over.

=== 2000 census ===
As of the census of 2000, there were 36,835 people, 14,693 households, and 10,270 families living in the county. The population density was 21 people per square mile (8.1 people/km^{2}). There were 19,646 housing units at an average density of 11 units per square mile (4.2 units/km^{2}). The racial makeup of the county was 96.58% White, 0.11% Black or African American, 0.87% Native American, 0.27% Asian, 0.05% Pacific Islander, 0.42% from other races, and 1.70% from two or more races. 1.64% of the population were Hispanic or Latino of any race. 20.9% were of German, 11.7% English, 11.7% American, 9.6% Irish and 5.3% Norwegian ancestry.

There were 14,693 households, out of which 30.60% had children under the age of 18 living with them, 58.60% were married couples living together, 7.50% had a female householder with no husband present, and 30.10% were non-families. 24.00% of all households were made up of individuals, and 8.20% had someone living alone who was 65 years of age or older. The average household size was 2.49 and the average family size was 2.94.

In the county, the population was spread out, with 25.50% under the age of 18, 6.70% from 18 to 24, 25.40% from 25 to 44, 29.30% from 45 to 64, and 13.10% who were 65 years of age or older. The median age was 41 years. For every 100 females there were 100.30 males. For every 100 females age 18 and over, there were 98.20 males.

The median income for a household in the county was $32,803, and the median income for a family was $37,930. Males had a median income of $32,504 versus $21,086 for females. The per capita income for the county was $17,263. About 11.90% of families and 15.50% of the population were below the poverty line, including 21.20% of those under age 18 and 10.20% of those age 65 or over.

== Politics ==
Like other counties in Idaho, Bonner County is strongly Republican-leaning. The last Democrat to win the county in a presidential election was Bill Clinton in 1992, and incumbent president George H.W. Bush fell to third place in the county, behind independent candidate Ross Perot. The tourism-oriented city of Sandpoint is more of a swing town and occasionally backs Democrats, but the rest of the county remains strongly Republican.

United States presidential election results for Bonner County, Idaho
Year	Republican		Democratic		Third party(ies)	
Year	No.	%	No.	%	No.	%
1908	2,512	58.88%	1,223	28.67%	531	12.45%
1912	711	17.23%	1,055	25.56%	2,361	57.21%
1916	1,417	36.76%	2,003	51.96%	435	11.28%
1920	2,217	60.16%	1,468	39.84%	0	0.00%
1924	1,714	40.19%	543	12.73%	2,008	47.08%
1928	2,861	63.24%	1,603	35.43%	60	1.33%
1932	1,989	34.10%	3,695	63.36%	148	2.54%
1936	2,016	33.64%	3,521	58.75%	456	7.61%
1940	3,072	44.27%	3,834	55.24%	34	0.49%
1944	2,924	48.23%	3,116	51.39%	23	0.38%
1948	2,666	45.44%	2,916	49.70%	285	4.86%
1952	4,309	56.36%	3,293	43.07%	43	0.56%
1956	3,937	52.84%	3,514	47.16%	0	0.00%
1960	3,575	46.80%	4,064	53.20%	0	0.00%
1964	2,975	40.74%	4,328	59.26%	0	0.00%
1968	3,240	45.75%	3,063	43.25%	779	11.00%
1972	4,405	57.47%	2,599	33.91%	661	8.62%
1976	4,549	51.37%	4,065	45.91%	241	2.72%
1980	6,727	56.34%	4,060	34.00%	1,153	9.66%
1984	6,889	58.89%	4,628	39.56%	182	1.56%
1988	5,721	49.94%	5,555	48.49%	179	1.56%
1992	3,937	28.49%	4,995	36.14%	4,889	35.37%
1996	6,207	43.00%	5,294	36.67%	2,935	20.33%
2000	8,945	61.53%	4,318	29.70%	1,274	8.76%
2004	10,697	60.49%	6,649	37.60%	338	1.91%
2008	11,145	57.01%	7,840	40.10%	565	2.89%
2012	11,367	60.45%	6,500	34.57%	936	4.98%
2016	13,343	63.71%	5,819	27.78%	1,781	8.50%
2020	18,369	67.16%	8,310	30.38%	673	2.46%
2024	21,352	71.52%	7,650	25.63%	851	2.85%

== Communities ==
=== Cities ===
- Sandpoint
- Clark Fork
- Dover
- East Hope
- Hope
- Kootenai
- Oldtown
- Ponderay
- Priest River

=== Census-designated place ===
- Blanchard
- Coolin
- Laclede

=== Unincorporated communities ===
- Careywood
- Cocolalla
- Colburn
- Lamb Creek
- Nordman
- Outlet Bay
- Sagle
- Vans Corner
- Westmond

== Ski area ==
- Schweitzer Mountain Resort

== Education ==
School districts include:

- Lake Pend Oreille School District 84
- Lakeland Joint School District 272
- West Bonner County School District 83

It is in the catchment area, but not the taxation zone, for North Idaho College.

== See also ==
- National Register of Historic Places listings in Bonner County, Idaho
