= U.S. Route 2 =

Discontinuous east-west U.S. route

U.S. Route 2
- US 2 highlighted in red

Route information
- Length: 2,575 mi (4,144 km)
- Existed: November 11, 1926–present

Western segment
- Length: 2,115 mi (3,404 km)
- West end: I-5 / SR 529 in Everett, WA
- Major intersections: I-90 / US 395 in Spokane, WA; I-15 in Shelby, MT; US 87 near Havre, MT; I-29 / US 81 in Grand Forks, ND; US 75 near Crookston, MN; I-35 in Duluth, MN; US 51 in Hurley, WI
- East end: I-75 / I-75 BS in St. Ignace, MI

Eastern segment
- Length: 459.5 mi (739.5 km)
- West end: US 11 in Rouses Point, NY
- Major intersections: I-89 / US 7 in Burlington, VT; I-91 / US 5 in St. Johnsbury, VT; US 3 in Lancaster, NH; US 1 in Houlton, ME
- East end: I-95 in Houlton, ME

Location
- Country: United States
- States: Washington, Idaho, Montana, North Dakota, Minnesota, Wisconsin, Michigan; New York, Vermont, New Hampshire, Maine

Highway system
- United States Numbered Highway System; List; Special; Divided
← US 1	→ US 3

U.S. Route 2 or U.S. Highway 2 (US 2) is an east–west United States Numbered Highway spanning 2,571 miles (4,138 km) across the northern continental United States. US 2 consists of two segments on either side of a portion of Canada. Unlike some routes, which are disconnected into segments because of encroaching Interstate Highways, the two portions of US 2 were designed to be separate in the original 1926 highway plan.

The western segment of US 2 begins at an interchange with Interstate 5 (I-5) and State Route 529 (Maple Street) in Everett, Washington, and ends at I-75 in St. Ignace, Michigan. The eastern segment of US 2 begins at US 11 in Rouses Point, New York, and ends at I-95 in Houlton, Maine.

As its number indicates, it is the northernmost east–west U.S. Highway in the country. It is the lowest primary-numbered east–west U.S. Highway, whose numbers otherwise end in zero, and was so numbered to avoid a US 0. Sections of US 2 in New England were once New England Route 15, part of the New England road marking system.

== Route description ==
=== Western segment ===
Lengths
	mi	km
WA	325	523
ID	80	130
MT	667	1,073
ND	354	570
MN	264	425
WI	120	190
MI	305	491
Total	2,115	3,404

The western segment of US 2 extends west from the Upper Peninsula of Michigan across the northern tier of the lower 48 states. Most of the western route was built roughly paralleling the Great Northern Railway. US 2 adopted the railway's route nickname "The Highline" as the most northern crossing in the U.S.

The Adventure Cycling Association's Northern Tier Bicycle Route is a bicycle touring route which follows or parallels US 2 for over 600 miles (970 km), most notably a 550-mile (890 km) stretch between Columbia Falls, Montana, and Williston, North Dakota.

==== Washington ====
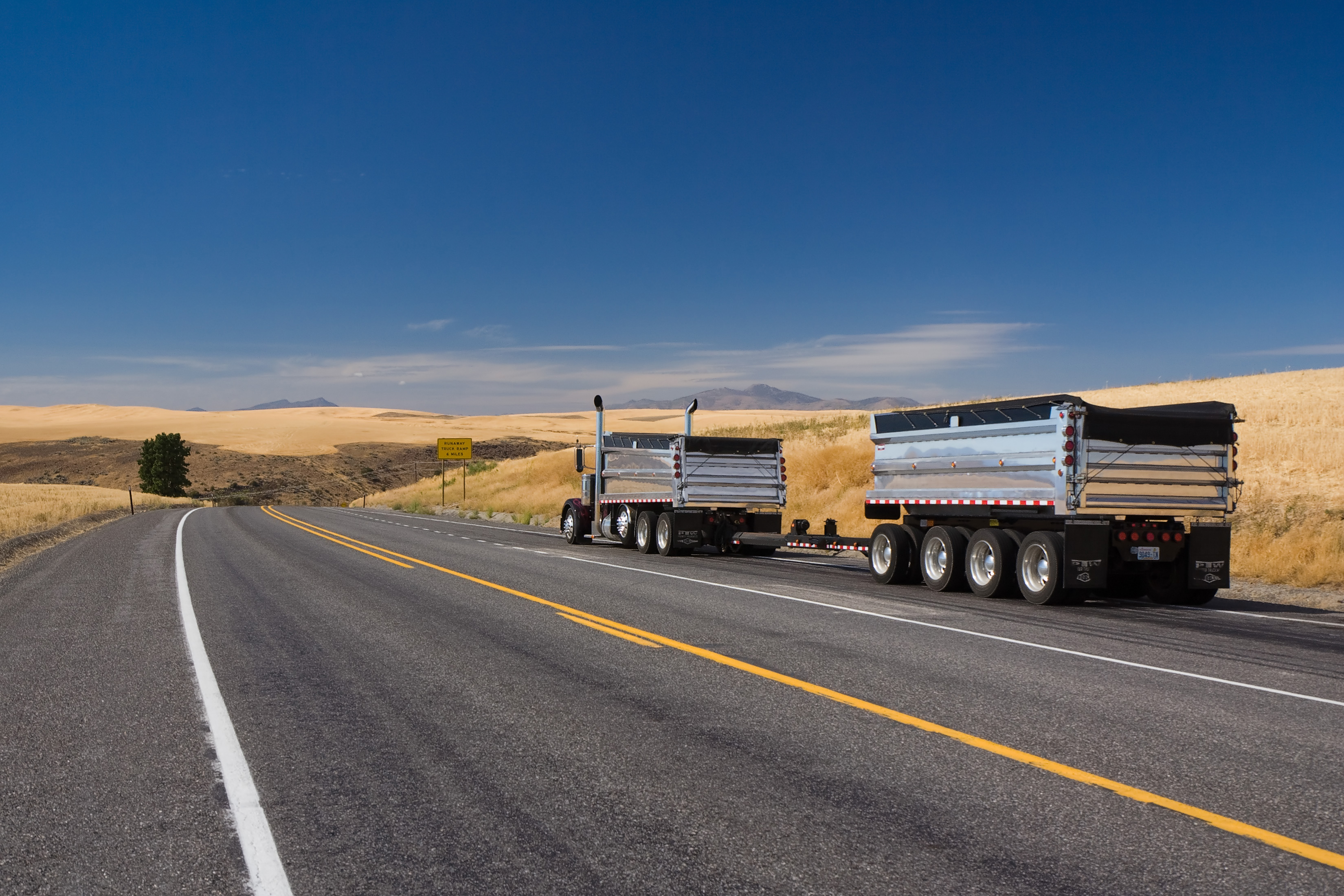
A section of US 2 near Waterville, Washington

Within Washington, US 2 is the northernmost all-season highway through the Cascade Mountains. It begins at I-5 and SR 529 in Everett and travels east via Stevens Pass. It intersects US 97 approximately four miles (6.4 km) east of Leavenworth and continues as a duplicate route crossing the Columbia River at Wenatchee, then continues north as far as Orondo, where US 97 splits north. US 2 continues to Spokane and the border in Newport.

==== Idaho ====
Shortly after entering Idaho from the west, US 2 crosses the Priest River. US 2 follows Pend Oreille River to its source at Lake Pend Oreille. US 2 intersects State Highway 57 in the town of Priest River at mile 5.8. US 2 intersects US 95 at mile 28.4 in the town of Sandpoint. The two routes overlap for 36.2 miles (58.3 km) until just after Bonners Ferry. At Three Mile Corner, US 2 continues southeast for 15.8 miles (25.4 km) where it crosses into Montana.

==== Montana ====
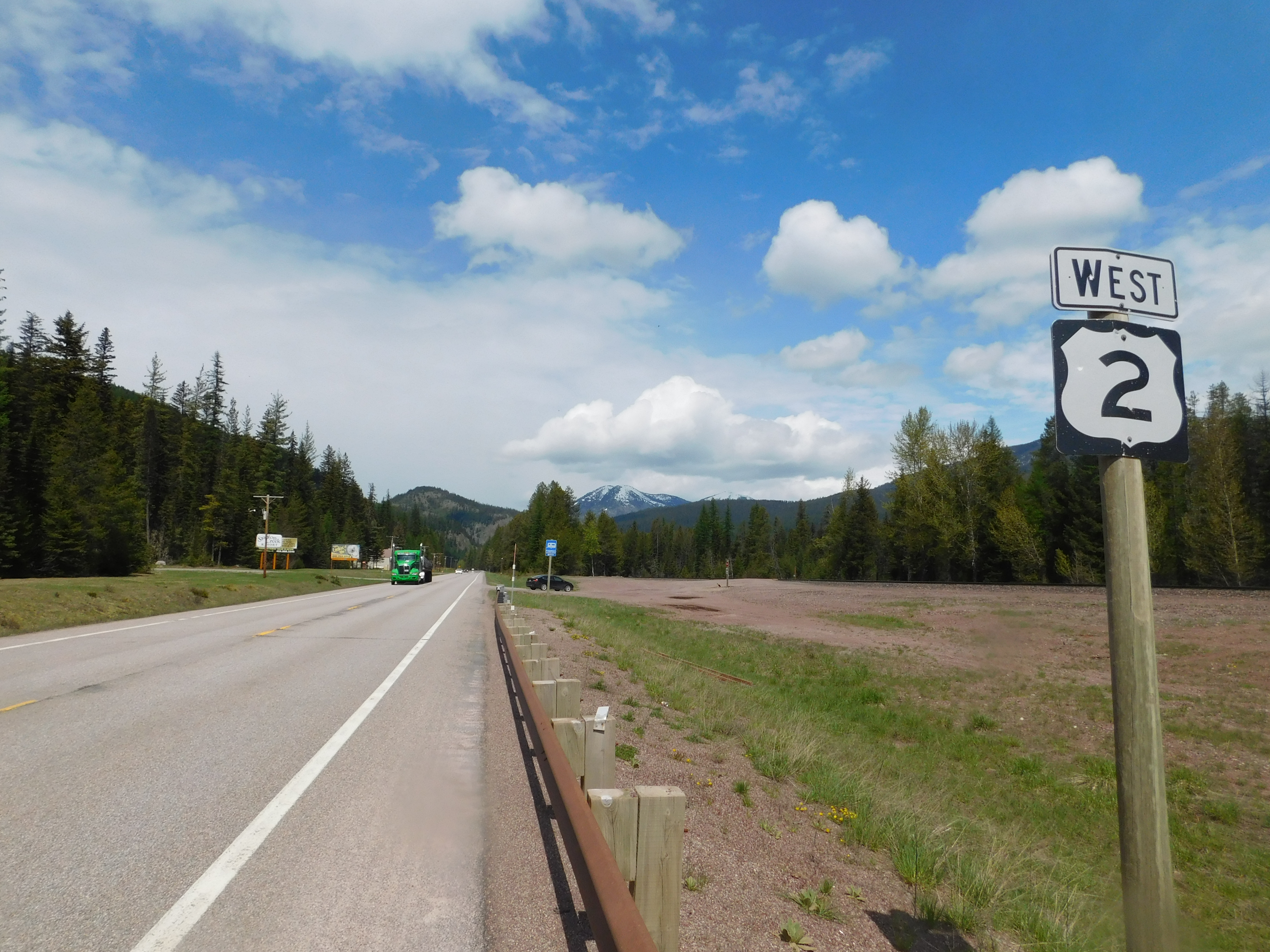
US 2 in Essex, Montana

US 2 is a vital northern corridor for Montana and has more mileage within Montana than in any other state. It intersects US 93 at Kalispell and passes through the southern end of Glacier National Park, crossing the Continental Divide at Marias Pass, before it enters the Great Plains west of Browning. It travels through Shelby where it meets I-15, before it goes on to Havre, where it meets the northern terminus of US 87, intersecting with US 191 in Malta, and then onward to Glasgow. The highway continues east and leaves the state near the confluence of the Missouri and Yellowstone rivers.

==== North Dakota ====
US 2 is an east–west highway that runs through North Dakota's northern tier of larger cities: Williston, Minot, Devils Lake, and Grand Forks. US 2 intersects US 85 at Williston, US 52 and US 83 at Minot, US 281 at Churchs Ferry (west of Devils Lake), and the I-29/US 81 concurrency at Grand Forks. US 2 is four lanes from North Dakota's eastern edge to just past Williston, a stretch of about 343 miles (552 km), leaving the remaining 12 miles (19 km) to the Montana border as a two-lane highway.

In Rugby, just east of the route's intersection with North Dakota Highway 3, the highway passes the location designated in 1931 as the geographical center of North America. The monument marking the geographic center had to be relocated in 1971 when US 2 was converted from two to four lanes.

==== Minnesota ====
The portion of US 2 from Cass Lake to Bemidji is officially designated the Paul Bunyan Expressway. It also intersects US 169 and the Mississippi River in Grand Rapids. At the crossing between Duluth and Superior, Wisconsin, the highway crosses the Richard I. Bong Memorial Bridge, about 8,300 feet (2,500 m) in length—roughly 11,800 feet (3,600 m) in length when the above land approaches are included.

Of the 266 miles (428 km) of US 2 in Minnesota, 146 miles (235 km) have four lanes, mostly located in the northwest part of the state.

Legally, the Minnesota section of US 2 is defined as Routes 8 and 203 in Minnesota Statutes §§161.114(2) and 161.115(134).

==== Wisconsin ====
After crossing the Bong Bridge and entering into the city of Superior, Wisconsin's western segment of the highway joins Belknap Street. After crossing the midsection of Superior, US 2 merges with US 53 for a few miles following East 2nd Street out of the city. US 53 and US 2 part ways 10 miles (16 km) outside of Superior. US 53 veers south toward Eau Claire, while US 2 continues to the city of Ashland and ultimately to the Wisconsin–Michigan state line at the city of Ironwood. An eastern segment of US 2 re-enters Wisconsin four miles (6.4 km) northwest of Florence and proceeds concurrently with US 141 for 14.5 miles (23.3 km) until exiting Wisconsin again near Iron Mountain, Michigan.

==== Michigan ====
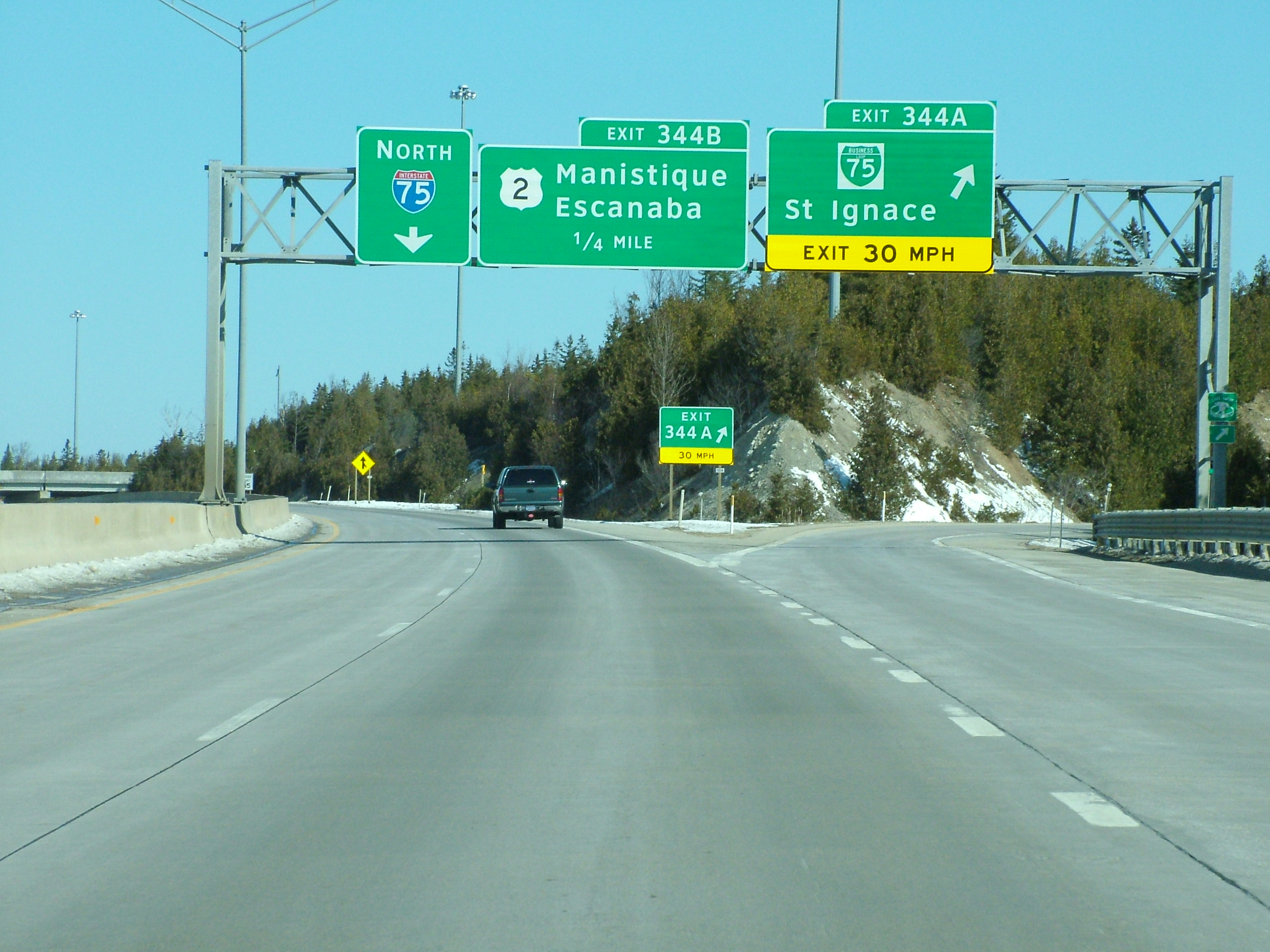
US 2 western segment eastern terminus

US 2 enters Michigan at the city of Ironwood and runs east to the town of Crystal Falls, where it turns south and re-enters Wisconsin northwest of Florence. It re-enters Michigan north of Iron Mountain and continues through the Upper Peninsula of Michigan to the cities of Escanaba, Manistique, and St. Ignace. Along the way, it cuts through the Ottawa and Hiawatha National Forests and follows the northern shore of Lake Michigan. It ends at I-75, just north of the Mackinac Bridge in St. Ignace.

=== Eastern segment ===
Lengths
	mi	km
NY	0.9	1.4
VT	150.4	242.0
NH	35.4	57.0
ME	272.8	439.0
Total	459.5	739.5

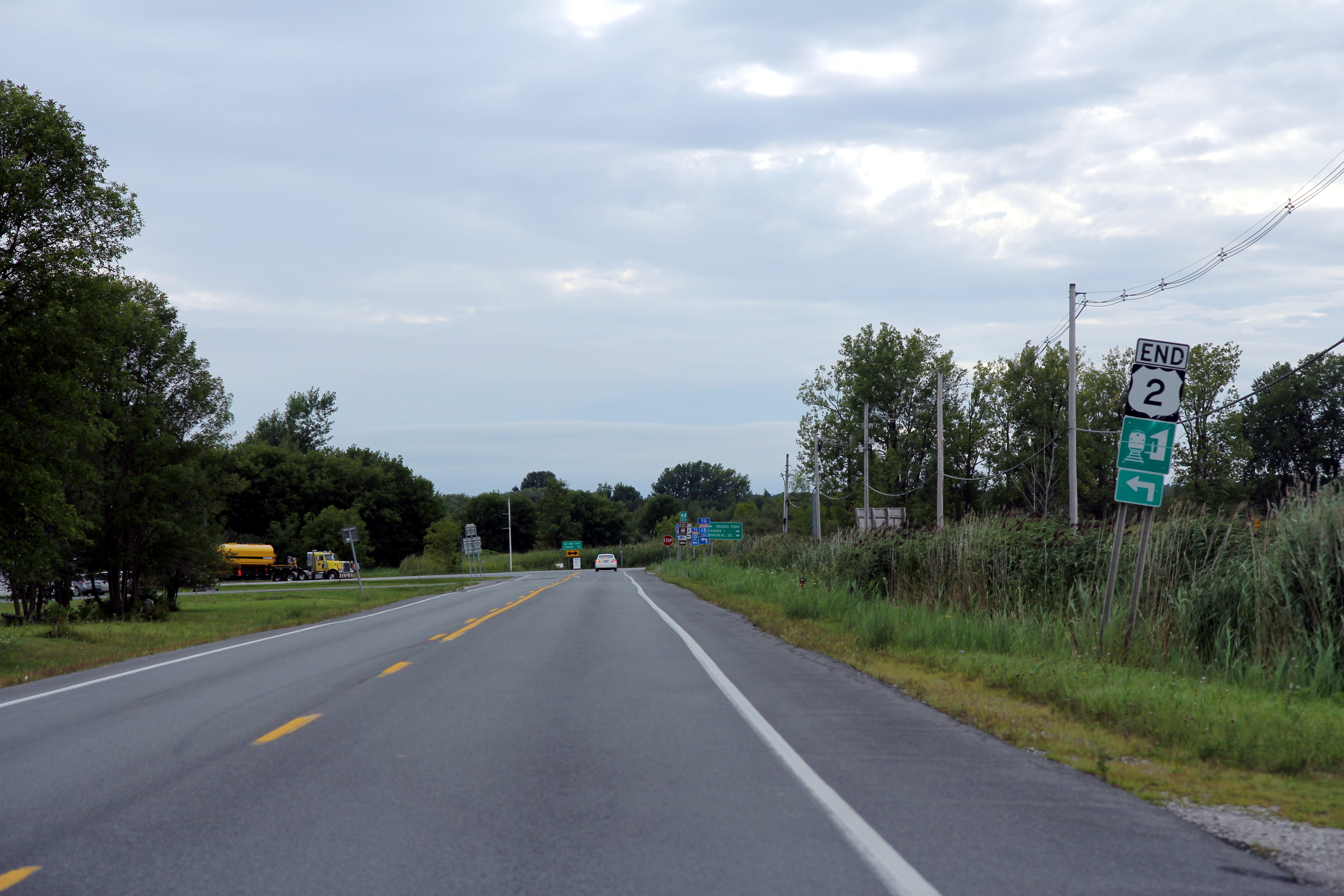
The west terminus of the east section in eastern New York

The eastern segment of US 2 traverses the northeastern part of New York and the northern New England states.

==== New York ====
The road starts at US 11, just one mile (1.6 km) south of the Canadian border at Rouses Point in Champlain. From there, it crosses the Richelieu River at the outlet of Lake Champlain on the Rouses Point Bridge into Grand Isle County, Vermont. The road is less than a mile (1.6 km) long in the state.

==== Vermont ====
US 2 traverses the length of Grand Isle County and crosses Lake Champlain over several bridges until it reaches the mainland in Milton and Chittenden County. From there, it travels south to Burlington, where it begins to closely parallel I-89 all the way to Montpelier, in Washington County. At Montpelier, the road turns northeastward, crossing into Caledonia County and passing through St. Johnsbury. It then passes into Essex County and eventually crosses the Connecticut River from Guildhall into Lancaster, New Hampshire.

==== New Hampshire ====
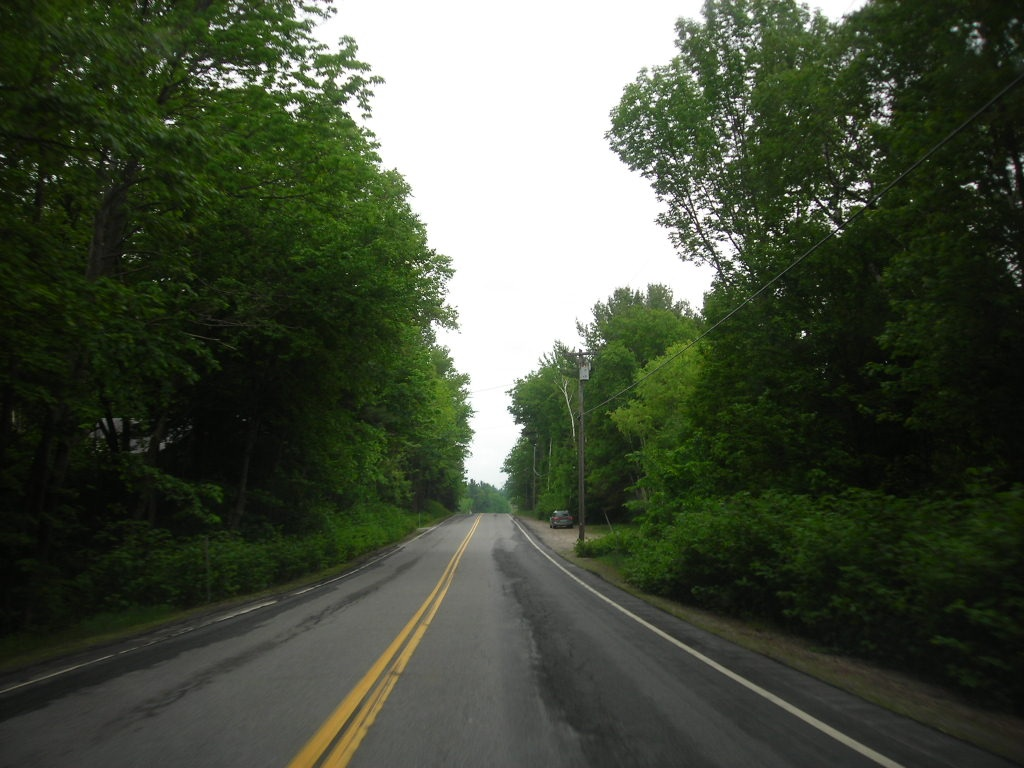
A section of highway traveling through New Hampshire

Once into New Hampshire, the road continues southeastward, passing through Jefferson (home to several small amusement parks and roadside attractions, such as Santa's Village) before heading more easterly, skirting the northern edge of the White Mountain National Forest into Gorham, where it meets Route 16, the major north–south roadway through the eastern half of the forest and past Mount Washington. From Gorham, the road travels east along the southern banks of the Androscoggin River to Shelburne and eventually crosses into Gilead, Maine. Throughout its entire 35-mile (56 km) stretch, the New Hampshire portion of US 2 is in Coös County.

==== Maine ====
US 2 travels from Gilead to Houlton near Houlton International Airport. US 2 ends at I-95 just west of the Canadian border.

== History ==
A large portion of the western segment of US 2, and a shorter piece of the eastern segment, follows the old Theodore Roosevelt International Highway. This auto trail, named in honor of the late former president and naturalist Theodore Roosevelt, was organized in February 1919 to connect Portland, Maine, with Portland, Oregon. The route taken by this highway left Portland, Maine, to the northwest, crossing New England via Littleton, New Hampshire, and Montpelier, Vermont, to Burlington, Vermont. It crossed Lake Champlain on the Burlington–Port Kent Ferry and headed west across Upstate New York, through Watertown and Rochester to Buffalo. After crossing Southern Ontario, the highway re-entered the U.S. in Detroit, Michigan, running northwest and north via Saginaw and Alpena to the Upper Peninsula of Michigan, where it turned west along the northern tier of the country. This portion took the route past Duluth, Minnesota; Minot, North Dakota; Havre, Montana; and Glacier National Park to Spokane, Washington. In order to reach Portland, Oregon, the highway turned south in Washington via Walla Walla to Pendleton, Oregon, where it headed west again via the Columbia River Highway to Portland. The last piece of the highway to be completed was over Marias Pass through Glacier National Park; cars were carried through the park on the Great Northern Railway until 1930.

The first interstate numbering for the Roosevelt Highway was in New England, where the New England road marking system was established in 1922. Route 18 followed the auto trail from Portland northwest to Montpelier, where it continued to Burlington via Route 14. Many of the states along the route also assigned numbers to the highway; for instance, New York labeled their portion New York State Route 3 in 1924. The Joint Board on Interstate Highways distributed its preliminary plan in 1925, in which a long section of the highway was labeled US 2, from St. Ignace, Michigan, west to Bonners Ferry, Idaho. East of St. Ignace, instead of crossing to the Lower Peninsula of Michigan like the Roosevelt Highway, the proposed US 2 traveled north to the international border at Sault Ste. Marie. It reappeared at Rouses Point, New York, following Route 30 and then rejoining the auto trail between Burlington and Montpelier. US 2 and the Roosevelt Highway both connected Montpelier to St. Johnsbury, but the latter took a direct path along Route 18, while the former was assigned to Route 25 to Wells River, where it overlapped proposed US 5 north to St. Johnsbury. There, where the Roosevelt Highway turned southeast to Portland, US 2 continued east along Route 15 to Bangor and Route 1 to Calais, then heading north on Route 24 to end in Houlton.

By the time the U.S. Highway system was finalized in late 1926, one relatively minor change had been made to US 2; it was swapped with US 1 between Bangor and Houlton, Maine, placing US 2 along the entire portion of Route 15 east of St. Johnsbury. Several other major parts of the auto trail received numbers, most notably US 30 from Portland, Oregon east to Pendleton, US 195 in eastern Washington, and US 23 in the Lower Peninsula of Michigan. In the mid-1930s, much of New York's portion of the road became US 104, and the part southeast of Littleton, New Hampshire, to Portland, Maine, became US 302, but by far the longest piece was that followed by US 2 between St. Ignace and Bonners Ferry. In 1946, US 2 was extended west of its original western terminus in Bonners Ferry in Idaho to Everett in Washington via Spokane along what was then US 10A.

=== Michigan ===
US 2 was in the original 1925 U.S. Highway plan by the Bureau of Public Roads and was first commissioned in Michigan in 1926, largely replacing M-12 save for the Crystal Falls-Iron Mountain segment, where US 2 was routed through Florence, Wisconsin.

US 2 originally ran in Michigan from Ironwood to St. Ignace, the same terminuses as today. The highway has undergone many realignments, mostly minor, between those cities since 1926. In 1933, the section between St. Ignace and Sault Ste. Marie was relocated along Mackinac Trail.

In 1957, the first segment of a new freeway opened between St. Ignace and Sault Ste. Marie. It ran from Evergreen Shores, north of St. Ignace, to present-day M-123 and replaced the former route on State Street and Mackinac Trail. Over the next six years, US 2 was moved from Mackinac Trail onto the new freeway as new sections opened. Beginning in 1961, the freeway was concurrently signed as an extension of I-75. The freeway was completed in 1963.

The eastern terminus of US 2 in Michigan was truncated back to St. Ignace in 1983, removing it entirely from the I-75 freeway.

=== New England ===

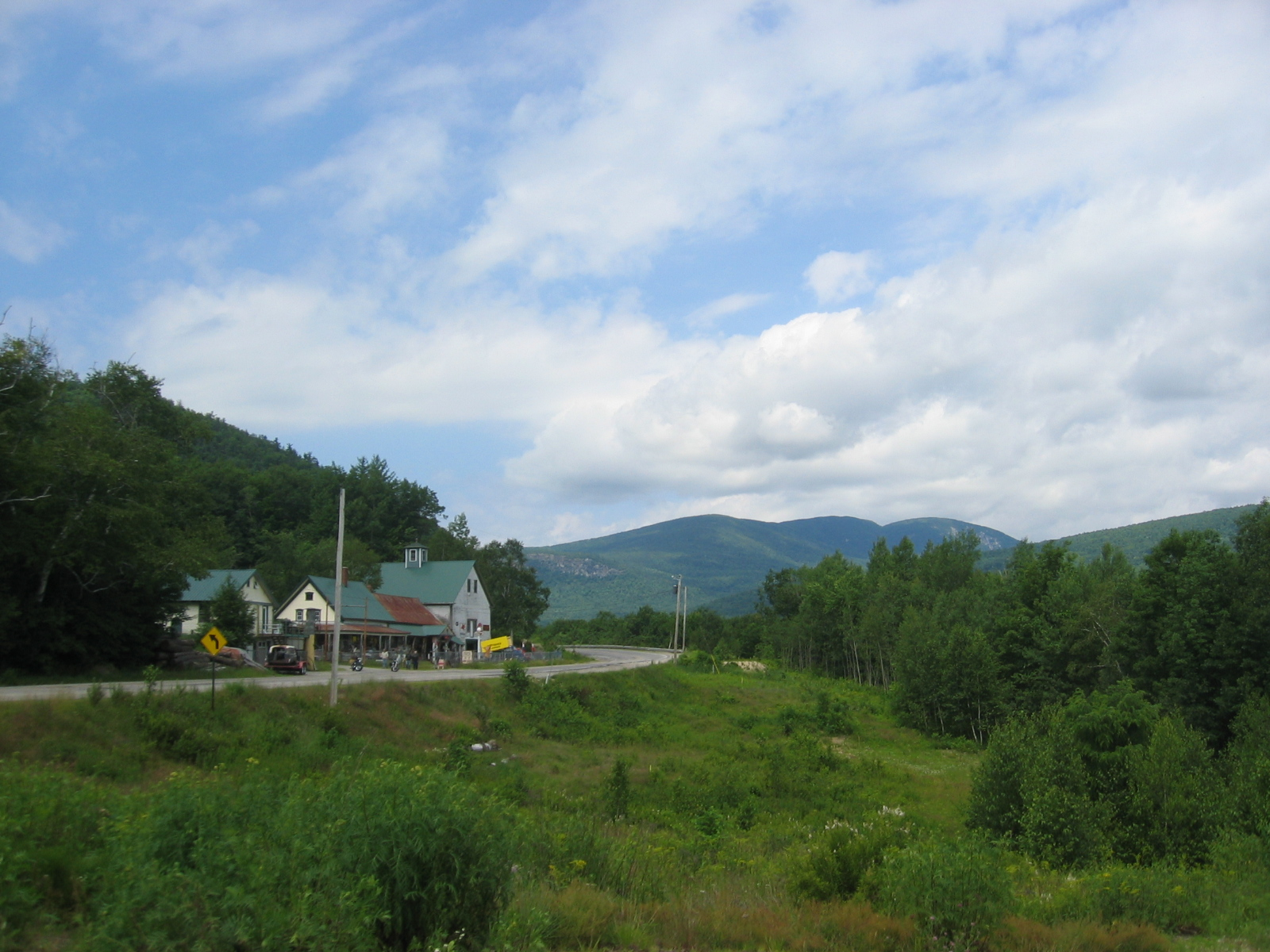
US 2 in Gilead, Maine

Before being designated as US 2, most of the current alignment was called New England Interstate Route 15 from Danville, Vermont, eastward to Maine. The portion of the old Route 15 that did not become part of US 2 was designated as Vermont Route 15.

Other sections of US 2 in Vermont that were not part of New England Route 15 were parts of other former New England Interstate routes: Route 18 between Montpelier and Danville; Route 14 between Burlington and Montpelier; and Route 30 between Alburgh and Burlington.

== Major intersections ==
Western segment

Washington
I-5 / SR 529 and Hewitt Avenue in Everett
US 97 runs concurrently from south-southeast of Peshastin to Orondo
I-90 / US 395 in Spokane with a concurrency through the city
US 195 in Spokane
I-90 in Spokane
US 395 in Spokane
Idaho
US 95 concurrently from east of Sandpoint to north-northeast of Bonners Ferry
Montana
US 93 in Kalispell
US 89 concurrently from west of Browning to southeast of South Browning
I-15 in Shelby
US 87 northeast of Herron
US 191 in Malta with a concurrency through the city
US 191 in Malta
North Dakota
US 85 west-southwest of Williston. The highways travel concurrently to north of Williston.
US 52 northwest of Burlington. The highways travel concurrently to southeast of Minot
US 83 in Minot
US 281 west-northwest of Churchs Ferry. The highways travel concurrently to west of Churchs Ferry.
I-29 / US 81 in Grand Forks
Minnesota
US 75 concurrently from north-northwest of Crookston to just north of Crookston
US 59 southeast of Erskine
US 71 in Bemidji with a concurrency through the city
US 169 in Grand Rapids with a concurrency through the city
I-35 in Duluth with a concurrency through the city
Wisconsin (western segment)
US 53 concurrently from Superior to east of South Range
US 63 north-northeast of Benoit
US 51 north of Hurley
Michigan (western segment)
US 45 in Watersmeet
US 141 concurrently from Crystal Falls through Wisconsin to Quinnesec
Wisconsin (eastern segment)
No major intersections
Michigan (eastern segment)
US 8 in Norway
US 41 concurrently from Powers to Rapid River
I-75 in St. Ignace
I-75 BL in St. Ignace

Eastern segment

New York
US 11 in Rouses Point
Vermont
I-89 in Colchester
US 7 concurrently from Colchester to Burlington
I-89 in South Burlington
US 302 in Montpelier
I-91 in St. Johnsbury
US 5 in St. Johnsbury with a concurrency through the city
New Hampshire
US 3 in Lancaster with a concurrency through the city
Maine
US 201 in Skowhegan with a concurrency through the city
I-95 / I-395 in Bangor
I-95 in Bangor
US 202 in Bangor
I-95 in Smyrna
US 1 in Houlton with a concurrency through the city
I-95 in Houlton

== Auxiliary routes ==
There have been at least three different three-digit child routes for US 2:

- US 102, a now defunct route that has been incorporated into US 141 in Michigan
- US 202, a northeast–southwest route in the northeastern and Mid-Atlantic U.S. whose southern terminus is in New Castle, Delaware, and runs northeast to its terminus near its parent route in Bangor, Maine
- US 302, an east–west route in New England whose western terminus is at its parent in Montpelier, Vermont, and whose eastern terminus is in Portland, Maine

== See also ==
- Special routes of U.S. Route 2
