= Colborne (surname) =

Colborne is a surname. Notable people by that name include:

- Col Colborne (1909–1987), Australian politician.
- Francis Colborne (1817–1895), commander of British troops in China.
- Howie Colborne (born 1950), Canadian ice hockey player.
- John Colborne, 1st Baron Seaton (1778–1863), British Army officer and colonial governor.
- Joe Colborne (born 1990), Canadian professional ice hockey forward.
- Michael Colborne (1934–2017), Royal Navy officer.
- Michael Colborne, a journalist that worked in Bellingcat.
- Nicholas Ridley-Colborne, 1st Baron Colborne (1779–1854), British politician.
- William Colborne (1859–1945), member of the Queensland Legislative Council.
