= Priest River =

Tributary of the Pend Oreille River, Idaho, United States

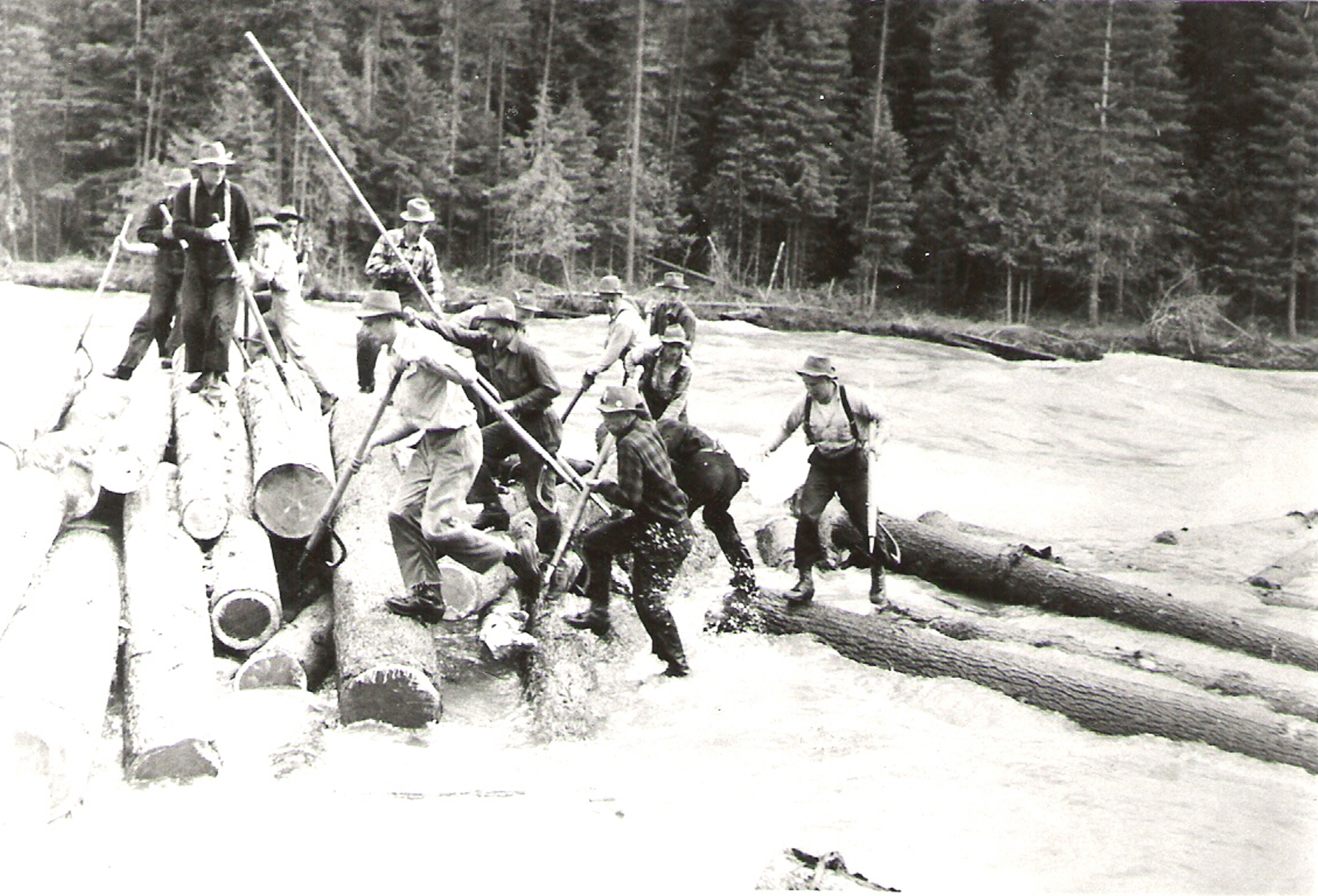
- Log drivers on the Priest River

- Location of the mouth of the Priest River in Idaho

Location
- Country: United States
- State: Idaho
- County: Bonner County, Idaho

Physical characteristics
- Source: Upper Priest Lake
  - location: Bonner County, Idaho
  - coordinates: 48°45′58″N 116°51′52″W
  - elevation: 2,445 ft (745 m)
- Mouth: Pend Oreille River
  - location: in Priest River, Bonner County, Idaho
  - coordinates: 48°10′37″N 116°53′34″W
  - elevation: 2,054 ft (626 m)
- Length: 68 mi (109 km)
- Basin size: 980 sq mi (2,500 km^{2})
- Discharge
  - location: Priest River, Idaho
  - average: 1,732 cuft/s
  - minimum: 285 cuft/s
  - maximum: 3,500 cuft/s

Basin features
- Tributaries
  - left: East River, Lion Creek
  - right: Upper West Branch, Lower West Branch, Granite Creek

The Priest River is a 68-mile (109 km) long tributary of the Pend Oreille River in the U.S. state of Idaho, located 40 miles below the Priest Lake. It is part of the Columbia River basin, as the Pend Oreille River is a tributary of the Columbia River. The river's drainage basin is 980 square miles (2,500 km^{2}) in area. It currently and historically supports bull and westslope cutthroat trout, which are the main focus of ongoing conservation efforts. These species of fish currently support native tribes in the area, as well as wildlife in general.

The Priest River takes its name from Priest Lake, which was named for a Roman Catholic priest, Father Pierre-Jean De Smet, S.J., who worked among the Kalispel people, whose traditional territory lies within the region. He initially tried to name the lake Roothaan Lake, after the Jesuit Superior General John Roothaan. The local natives rejected the unfamiliar European name, opting to name it after Priest Lake after Fr. de Smet himself. Other names for this river include the Kaniksu River, which means 'black robe' in the Kalispel language, which refers to how the native peoples saw Jesuit Missionaries.

== History ==
The Priest River has been and still is home to the Kalispel Tribe of American Indians for thousands of years. Their ancestral lands cover a significant amount of area in the river. During the 19th century, German immigrants settled around modern day Priest River. The next influx of non-indigenous people were the Italians in the late 1890s, as they wanted to work for the Great Northern Railroad by hewing ties. Ever since then, wood has become a staple of the Priest River economy. This indirectly changed the landscape due to economic activities. Such activities include logging, grazing, and beaver trapping. Nowadays, recreation is the primary use of the river, with the outlet dam supported by its usage as an unintended benefit.

== Course ==
The Priest River originates in Upper Priest Lake and flows south into Priest Lake. It exits the south end of Priest Lake and flows south to the Pend Oreille River near the city of Priest River. The Upper Priest River, which is sometimes considered part of the Priest River proper, originates near the US-Canada border and flows south into Upper Priest Lake.

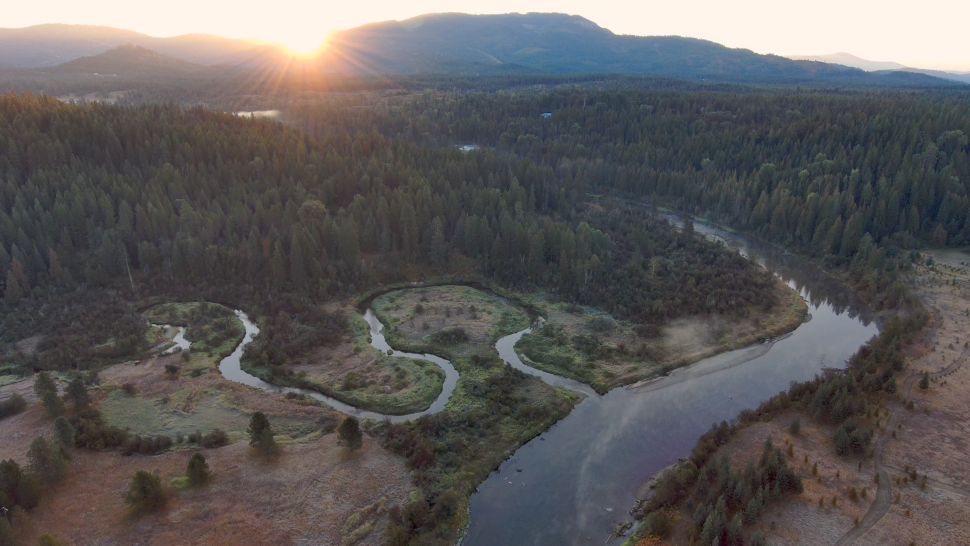
Priest River

== Impairments ==
The Priest River has similar issues to rivers around the area that are impacted by the summer heat. There are several issues with the river, such as high levels of river incision that create several trenches, preventing water from reaching the flat floodplain, accelerate erosion along the river, and destroy habitats downstream. Another issue is the elevated temperature in the summer due to a myriad of characteristics, such as low summer water flow and few side channels to control the temperature of the river. There is also a lack of in-stream wood to create micro habitats and provide benefits fish in a variety of ways. In the worst cases, fish perish due to the intense summer heat. All of these make it difficult for fish to navigate through this river, creating a challenging environment.

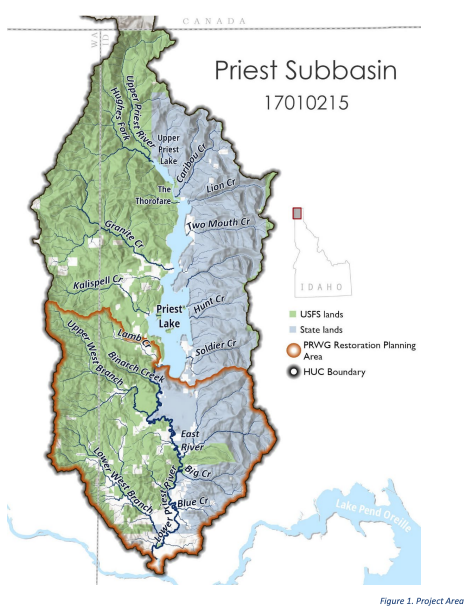
The 2024-2034 area conservation area of the Priest River Watershed Group.

== Conservation efforts ==
As of 2026, the Priest River Watershed Group is the primary organization that aims to restore the Priest River Watershed, specifically the lower Priest River Basin. They are currently implementing a 10-year plan spanning from 2024 to 2034. An example of their conservation efforts is reintroducing in-stream wood to create pools and provide shade for fish in the summer. They are also attempting to improve fish passage and water flow that the Priest Lake Outlet Dam historically blocked.

== Tributaries ==
The Priest River has three major tributaries. On the left, there is the East River. This river has about twenty tributaries itself, and flows into the Priest about 1 mile from Big Creek. On the right there is the Upper West Branch of the Priest River, and the Lower West Branch of the Priest River. These never merge. The Lower West Branch is more popular, this has Torelle Falls on it.

List:

- Indian Creek
- Lion Creek
- Hunt Creek
- Soldier Creek
- Quartz Creek
- Upper west branch Priest River
- Lower west branch Priest River
- East River
- Big Creek
- Blue Creek

== See also ==
- List of Idaho rivers
- List of longest streams of Idaho
- Tributaries of the Columbia River
