= Priest River, Idaho =

- City
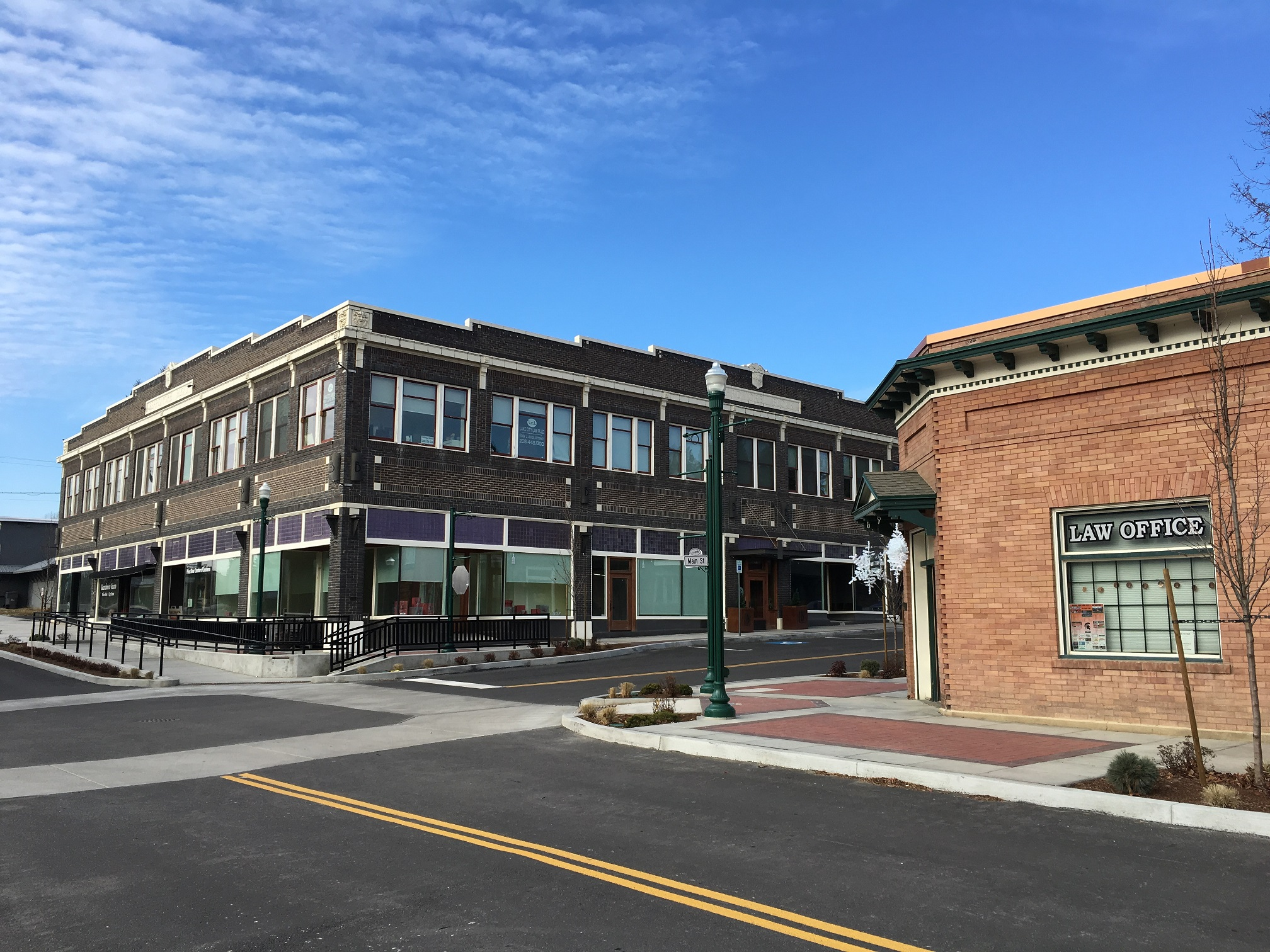

- Location of Priest River in Bonner County, Idaho.
- Coordinates: 48°10′56″N 116°53′24″W
- Country: United States
- State: Idaho
- County: Bonner

Area
  - Total: 3.70 sq mi (9.58 km^{2})
  - Land: 3.55 sq mi (9.20 km^{2})
  - Water: 0.14 sq mi (0.37 km^{2})
- Elevation: 2,169 ft (661 m)

Population (2020)
  - Total: 1,696
  - Density: 532.7/sq mi (205.67/km^{2})
- Time zone: UTC-8 (Pacific (PST))
  - Summer (DST): UTC-7 (PDT)
- ZIP code: 83856
- Area codes: 208, 986
- FIPS code: 16-65530
- GNIS feature ID: 2411492
- Website: priestriver-id.gov

Priest River is a city in Bonner County, Idaho. The population was 1,696 at the 2020 census, and 1,751 at the 2010 census. Located in the Idaho Panhandle region of the state, the city is at the mouth of the Priest River on the Pend Oreille River.

== Geography ==
According to the United States Census Bureau, the city has a total area of 3.84 square miles (9.95 km^{2}), of which, 3.69 square miles (9.56 km^{2}) is land and 0.15 square miles (0.39 km^{2}) is water.

Priest River is located on the west bank of the Priest River, which drains Priest Lake 68 miles to the north, where the Priest River joins the much larger Pend Oreille River on its north bank. U.S. Route 2 passes through the town from Sandpoint on the east to Newport and the state of Washington on the west.

It is 7 miles (11 km) east of the border with Washington at Newport, and less than 60 miles (100 km) south (as the crow flies) of British Columbia, Canada.

=== Climate ===
According to the Köppen Climate Classification system, Priest River has a warm-summer mediterranean climate, abbreviated "Csb" on climate maps. The hottest temperature recorded in Priest River was 108 °F (42.2 °C) on June 29, 2021, while the coldest temperature recorded was −36 °F (−37.8 °C) on December 30, 1968.

Climate data for Priest River, Idaho, 1991–2020 normals, extremes 1898–present
Month	Jan	Feb	Mar	Apr	May	Jun	Jul	Aug	Sep	Oct	Nov	Dec	Year
Record high °F (°C)	52 (11)	57 (14)	73 (23)	88 (31)	97 (36)	108 (42)	105 (41)	105 (41)	97 (36)	83 (28)	64 (18)	57 (14)	108 (42)
Mean maximum °F (°C)	43.2 (6.2)	47.0 (8.3)	60.3 (15.7)	74.0 (23.3)	84.0 (28.9)	88.7 (31.5)	94.8 (34.9)	95.0 (35.0)	86.4 (30.2)	70.7 (21.5)	51.6 (10.9)	42.6 (5.9)	96.6 (35.9)
Mean daily maximum °F (°C)	31.8 (−0.1)	36.8 (2.7)	46.1 (7.8)	56.7 (13.7)	67.9 (19.9)	73.5 (23.1)	83.2 (28.4)	82.9 (28.3)	71.9 (22.2)	54.0 (12.2)	38.4 (3.6)	30.9 (−0.6)	56.2 (13.4)
Daily mean °F (°C)	26.9 (−2.8)	29.4 (−1.4)	36.3 (2.4)	44.0 (6.7)	53.3 (11.8)	58.9 (14.9)	65.4 (18.6)	64.3 (17.9)	55.5 (13.1)	43.1 (6.2)	32.7 (0.4)	26.5 (−3.1)	44.7 (7.1)
Mean daily minimum °F (°C)	22.1 (−5.5)	22.0 (−5.6)	26.4 (−3.1)	31.2 (−0.4)	38.8 (3.8)	44.2 (6.8)	47.6 (8.7)	45.8 (7.7)	39.0 (3.9)	32.0 (0.0)	27.1 (−2.7)	22.1 (−5.5)	33.2 (0.7)
Mean minimum °F (°C)	−0.2 (−17.9)	2.7 (−16.3)	11.0 (−11.7)	21.5 (−5.8)	26.5 (−3.1)	33.5 (0.8)	37.5 (3.1)	35.1 (1.7)	26.5 (−3.1)	17.4 (−8.1)	10.1 (−12.2)	2.8 (−16.2)	−8.0 (−22.2)
Record low °F (°C)	−33 (−36)	−35 (−37)	−18 (−28)	−1 (−18)	18 (−8)	24 (−4)	29 (−2)	26 (−3)	16 (−9)	−5 (−21)	−12 (−24)	−36 (−38)	−36 (−38)
Average precipitation inches (mm)	3.95 (100)	2.59 (66)	3.40 (86)	2.50 (64)	2.76 (70)	2.61 (66)	0.97 (25)	0.87 (22)	1.30 (33)	2.89 (73)	4.19 (106)	4.53 (115)	32.56 (826)
Average snowfall inches (cm)	21.8 (55)	11.3 (29)	5.4 (14)	0.3 (0.76)	0.0 (0.0)	0.0 (0.0)	0.0 (0.0)	0.0 (0.0)	0.0 (0.0)	0.2 (0.51)	9.2 (23)	25.7 (65)	73.9 (187.27)
Average extreme snow depth inches (cm)	22.1 (56)	21.1 (54)	17.5 (44)	2.7 (6.9)	0.0 (0.0)	0.0 (0.0)	0.0 (0.0)	0.0 (0.0)	0.0 (0.0)	6.1 (15)	16.0 (41)	22.1 (56)	25.3 (64)
Average precipitation days (≥ 0.01 in)	16.4	12.2	13.7	13.0	12.3	11.9	5.6	5.3	7.0	12.0	15.6	16.5	141.5
Average snowy days (≥ 0.1 in)	10.6	6.4	3.6	0.3	0.0	0.0	0.0	0.0	0.0	0.1	4.7	11.8	37.5
Source 1: NOAA
Source 2: National Weather Service

== Highways ==
- - US 2 - to Sandpoint (northeast) and Spokane, Washington (southwest)
- - SH-57 - to Priest Lake (north)

== Demographics ==
Historical population
Census	Pop.	Note	%±
1910	248		—
1920	545		119.8%
1930	949		74.1%
1940	1,056		11.3%
1950	1,592		50.8%
1960	1,749		9.9%
1970	1,493		−14.6%
1980	1,639		9.8%
1990	1,560		−4.8%
2000	1,754		12.4%
2010	1,751		−0.2%
2020	1,696		−3.1%
2019 (est.)	1,893		8.1%
U.S. Decennial Census

=== 2020 census ===
As of the 2020 census, Priest River had a population of 1,696. The median age was 41.2 years. 21.0% of residents were under the age of 18 and 21.3% of residents were 65 years of age or older. For every 100 females there were 103.6 males, and for every 100 females age 18 and over there were 97.8 males age 18 and over.

0.0% of residents lived in urban areas, while 100.0% lived in rural areas.

There were 714 households in Priest River, of which 27.5% had children under the age of 18 living in them. Of all households, 45.4% were married-couple households, 18.1% were households with a male householder and no spouse or partner present, and 27.7% were households with a female householder and no spouse or partner present. About 26.6% of all households were made up of individuals and 13.7% had someone living alone who was 65 years of age or older.

There were 761 housing units, of which 6.2% were vacant. The homeowner vacancy rate was 0.8% and the rental vacancy rate was 2.0%.

Racial composition as of the 2020 census
Race	Number	Percent
White	1,559	91.9%
Black or African American	4	0.2%
American Indian and Alaska Native	16	0.9%
Asian	11	0.6%
Native Hawaiian and Other Pacific Islander	2	0.1%
Some other race	21	1.2%
Two or more races	83	4.9%
Hispanic or Latino (of any race)	51	3.0%

=== 2010 census ===
As of the census of 2010, there were 1,751 people, 713 households, and 474 families living in the city. The population density was 474.5 inhabitants per square mile (183.2/km^{2}). There were 798 housing units at an average density of 216.3 per square mile (83.5/km^{2}). The racial makeup of the city was 93.3% White, 0.1% African American, 1.1% Native American, 0.6% Asian, 0.2% Pacific Islander, 0.8% from other races, and 3.9% from two or more races. Hispanic or Latino of any race were 2.1% of the population.

There were 713 households, of which 34.5% had children under the age of 18 living with them, 44.5% were married couples living together, 12.2% had a female householder with no husband present, 9.8% had a male householder with no wife present, and 33.5% were non-families. 28.1% of all households were made up of individuals, and 12.7% had someone living alone who was 65 years of age or older. The average household size was 2.45 and the average family size was 2.98.

The median age in the city was 38.1 years. 26.7% of residents were under the age of 18; 8.6% were between the ages of 18 and 24; 23.5% were from 25 to 44; 25.5% were from 45 to 64; and 15.8% were 65 years of age or older. The gender makeup of the city was 49.2% male and 50.8% female.

=== 2000 census ===
As of the census of 2000, there were 1,754 people, 692 households, and 469 families living in the city. The population density was 1,098.8 inhabitants per square mile (424.2/km^{2}). There were 762 housing units at an average density of 477.4 per square mile (184.3/km^{2}). The racial makeup of the city was 94.70% White, 1.43% Native American, 0.46% Asian, 0.51% from other races, and 2.91% from two or more races. Hispanic or Latino of any race were 1.60% of the population.

There were 692 households, out of which 35.1% had children under the age of 18 living with them, 54.9% were married couples living together, 9.1% had a female householder with no husband present, and 32.2% were non-families. 26.6% of all households were made up of individuals, and 12.4% had someone living alone who was 65 years of age or older. The average household size was 2.53 and the average family size was 3.09.

In the city, the population was spread out, with 28.9% under the age of 18, 8.4% from 18 to 24, 26.6% from 25 to 44, 21.9% from 45 to 64, and 14.1% who were 65 years of age or older. The median age was 35 years. For every 100 females, there were 96.0 males. For every 100 females age 18 and over, there were 93.3 males.

The median income for a household in the city was $26,765, and the median income for a family was $32,198. Males had a median income of $30,607 versus $16,034 for females. The per capita income for the city was $14,125. About 14.0% of families and 18.9% of the population were below the poverty line, including 27.7% of those under age 18 and 9.7% of those age 65 or over.

== See also ==
- List of cities in Idaho
- Priest River Lamanna High School
