= Priest Lake =

Lake in Idaho, United States

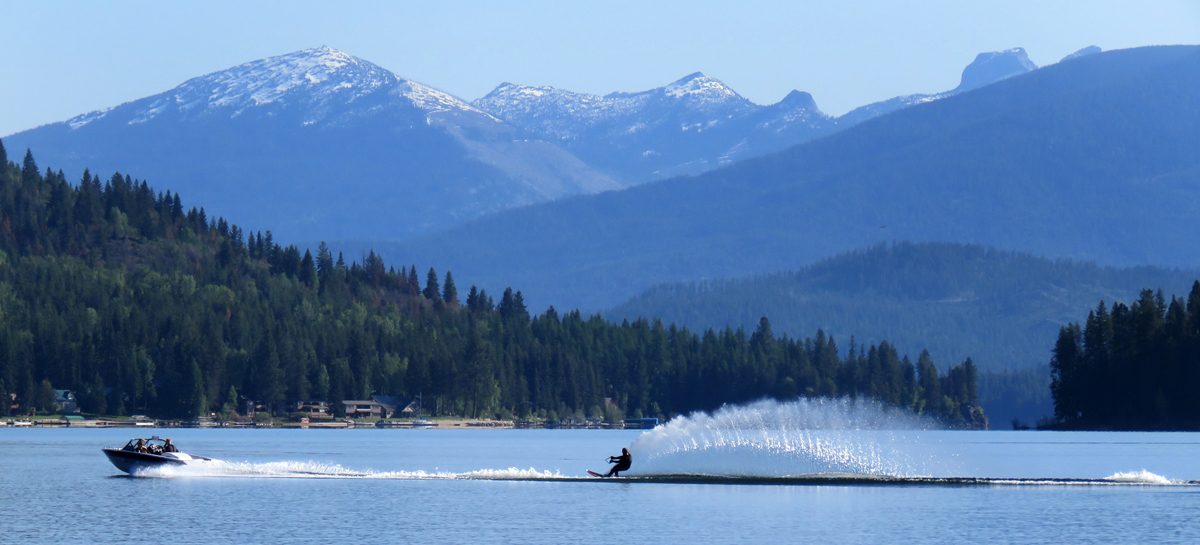

- Location within Idaho Location within the United States
- Location: Bonner County, Idaho, United States
- Coordinates: 48°34′N 116°52′W
- Primary inflows: Priest River (via Upper Priest Lake); Indian creek; Lion creek; Hunt creek
- Primary outflows: Priest River
- Basin countries: United States
- Max. length: 19 mi (31 km)
- Max. width: 4.4 mi (7.1 km)
- Surface area: 26,000 acres (110 km^{2})
- Max. depth: 369 ft (112 m)
- Surface elevation: 2,439 ft (743 m)
- Islands: 7

Priest Lake is a lake in Idaho, United States, in the northernmost portion of the Idaho Panhandle, 80 miles (130 km) northeast of Spokane, Washington. The northern end of the lake extends to within 15 miles (24 km) of the Canada–United States border. The primary lake, lower Priest, is 19 miles (31 km) long and over 300 feet (91 m) deep. Upper Priest is connected by a 2.5 miles (4.0 km) thoroughfare to lower Priest.

== History ==
The history of the lake dates back almost 10,000 years to the end of the last ice age. After the vast glaciers that had covered most of the area receded and vegetation started to regrow, humans started to resettle the area. That is evident from historical artifacts found in the area and ancient rock art along the lake.

In the early 19th century fur trappers established trade with the native Kalispel tribe. In the 1840s Jesuit priest Pierre-Jean DeSmet began working with the Kalispel tribe along the nearby Pend Oreille River. From the tribe's information about Priest Lake, De Smet was able to create a map and named the lake Roothaan Lake for one of his superiors in Rome. The name would not stick though and in 1865 Captain John Mullan, a U.S. Army Captain who was traveling through the area under orders to build a road (later known as the "Mullan Road") from Walla Walla, Washington to Fort Benton, Montana, after the discovery of silver in the central Idaho mountains along what today is the route of Interstate 90, would rename the lake Kaniksu. The lake was later named Priest Lake.

== Logging ==
Since the 1890s, logging has played an important role at Priest Lake. Logs were floated down the lake, and eventually to the outlet where they would travel down the Priest River until they reached the mills on the Pend Oreille River. National concern over conservation of natural resources led to the Forest Reserve Act of 1891, under which the Priest River Forest Reserve was established in 1897. This forest reserve subsequently evolved into the Kaniksu National Forest – which has been recently incorporated into the Idaho Panhandle National Forests system. Most of the area on the east side of Priest Lake became school or endowment land for Idaho. In 1911, the state wanted to consolidate the three million acres of scattered parcels it received with statehood into a compact body to better manage timber sales effectively. It took 10 years of talks with the Secretary of Agriculture, a proclamation from President William Howard Taft, multiple court cases, much lobbying by timber interests, and an act of the U.S. Congress for Idaho to receive title to the Kaniksu National Forest's eastside land in 1917. In 1950 these state lands to the east of Priest Lake were designated as Priest Lake State Forest. Later, in the 1980s, the State executed land exchanges with private companies that added nearly 13,000 acres (53 km^{2}) to the state forest and resulted in its present boundaries.

== Wildlife ==
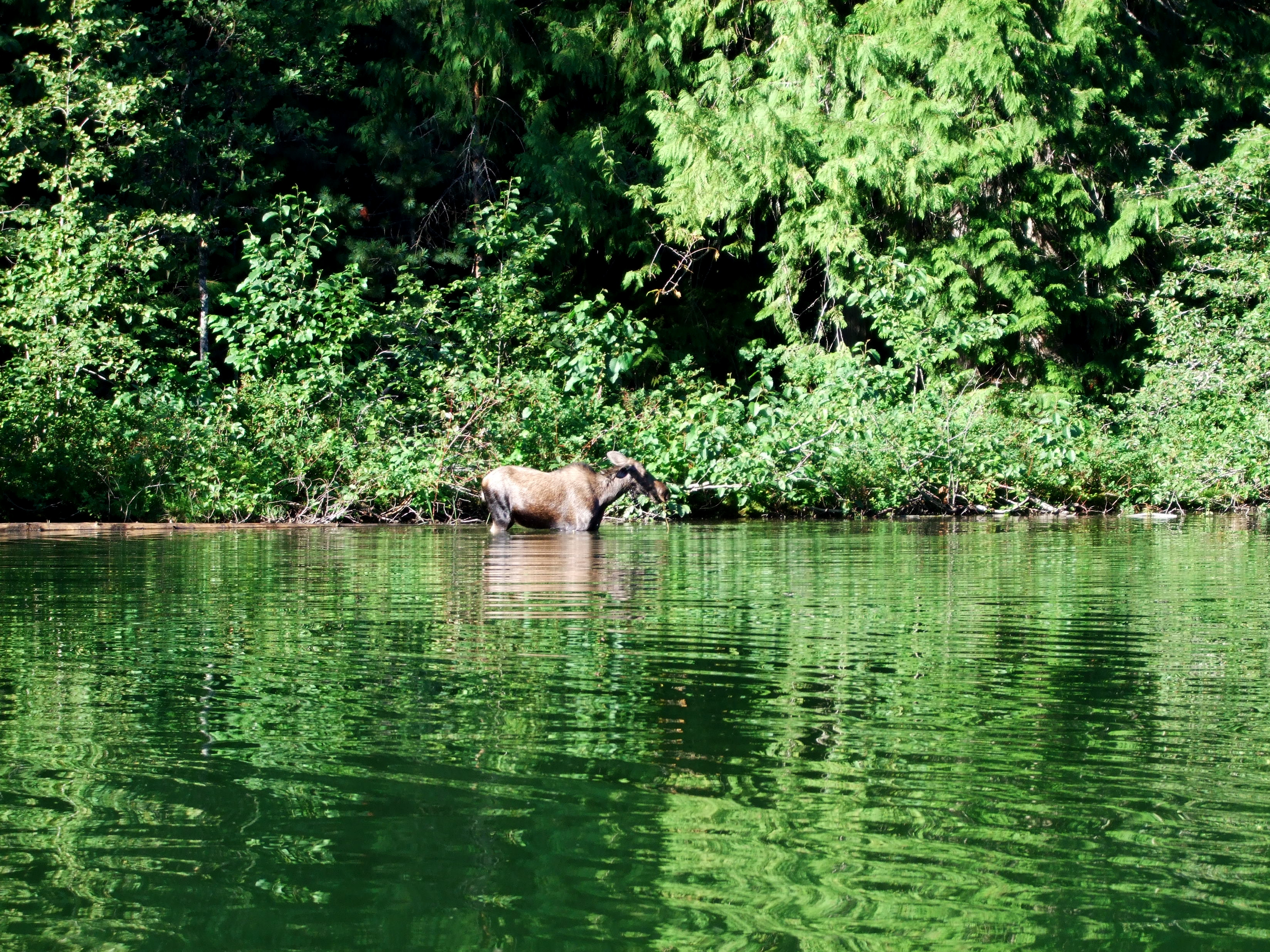
A moose feeding

Priest Lake has a pristine variety of wildlife both in and around the lake. The standard bear, deer, and moose population that can be seen throughout northern Washington and Idaho is present about the lake, as well as a small population of grizzly bears. Priest Lake also has a large population of fish, including cutthroat trout, Kokanee, lake trout, and Dolly Varden trout. The largest lake trout caught in the United States was caught at Priest Lake, by a Spokane Washington man, Lyle McClure, in 1971 and weighed 57 lbs. 8 oz. The average lake trout ranges weighs in between 4 and 10 pounds.

In 2006, Eurasian milfoil, an aquatic invasive species, was discovered in Priest Lake.

== Tourism ==
Today, the lake's biggest draw is tourism. There are several large private resorts on the lake including Cavanaugh's Resort, Elkins Resort and Hill's Resort. Popular campgrounds include Indian Creek and Lionhead run by the State of Idaho as well as Beaver Creek, Reeder Bay, Osprey, Outlet Bay, and Luby Bay, which are all located in and run by the Idaho Panhandle National Forest. Several hiking trails circle the lake, also connecting to the Upper Priest Lake. In the wintertime, the larger resorts cater to cross-country skiing, snowshoeing, and snowmobiling. There is also a bed and breakfast - the historic Old Northern Inn, Coolin Motel, Nordman Resort (Nordman, Idaho), and three marinas, one located at the lake's largest town, Coolin. The Priest Lake Public Library, located at the corner of Luby Bay Road and Highway 57, is open year-round. Housed in the historic Lamb Creek School, the library has wireless internet access and an extensive local history collection. The Priest Lake Museum, located in a 1935 USFS Guard Station on Luby Bay, hosts exhibits and programs on the area's rich heritage. The area is known for its huckleberries which visitors are encouraged to hike in and pick.

== Weather ==
Both summer and winter activities at the lake are made possible by a truly four-season climate. Summers are generally warm and sunny with high temperatures around 85 degrees Fahrenheit (29 degrees Celsius). Swimming and boating are very popular in the summer. Winters are cold and snowy, and although not as cold as east of the Rocky Mountains, the area does get much more snow. Sixty inches (1.5 m) of precipitation falls in the mountains around the lake each year with almost half of that coming in the form of snow. Cross country skiing and snowmobiling are popular winter activities.

== Gallery ==
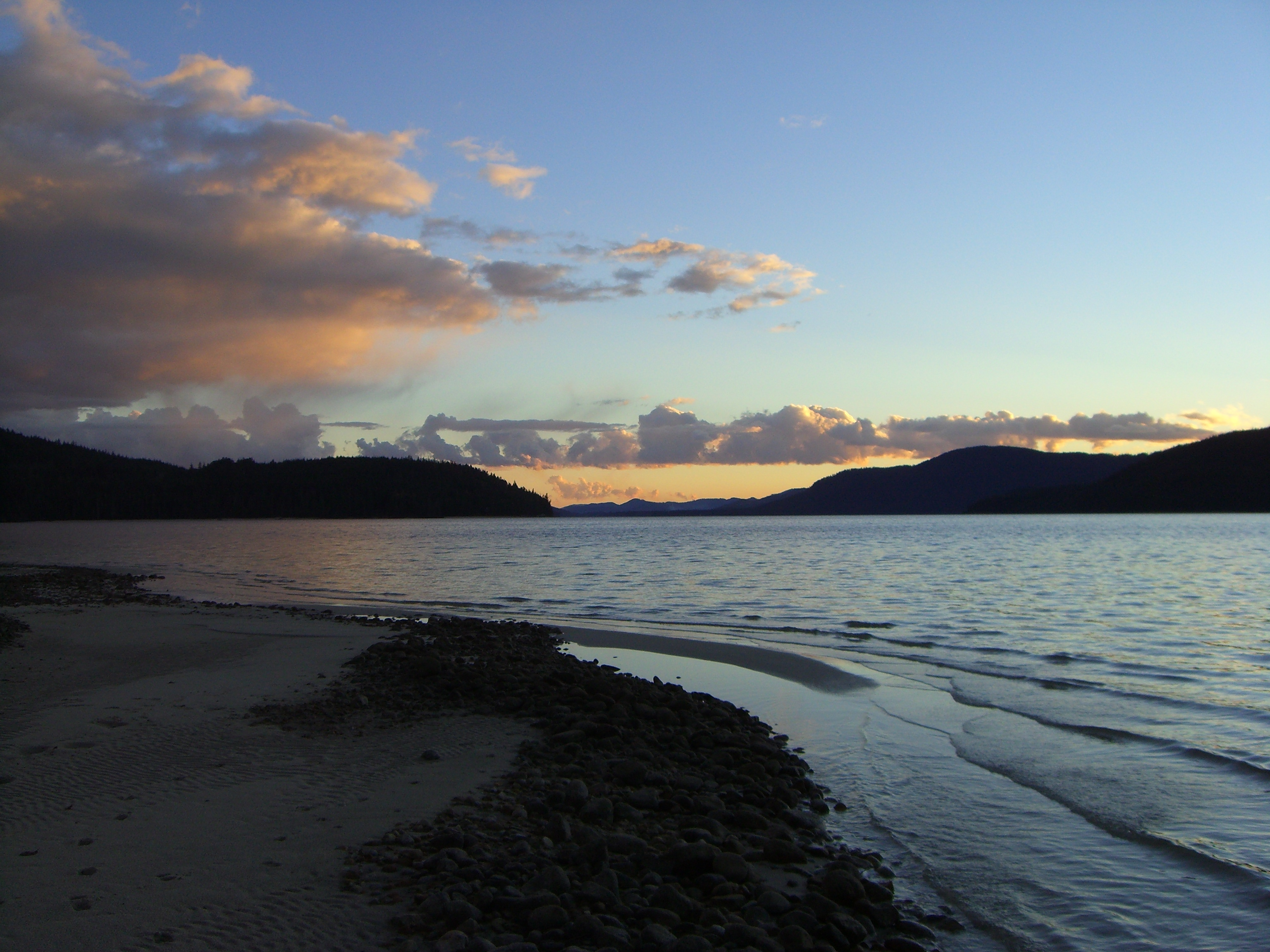
A sunset in Autumn

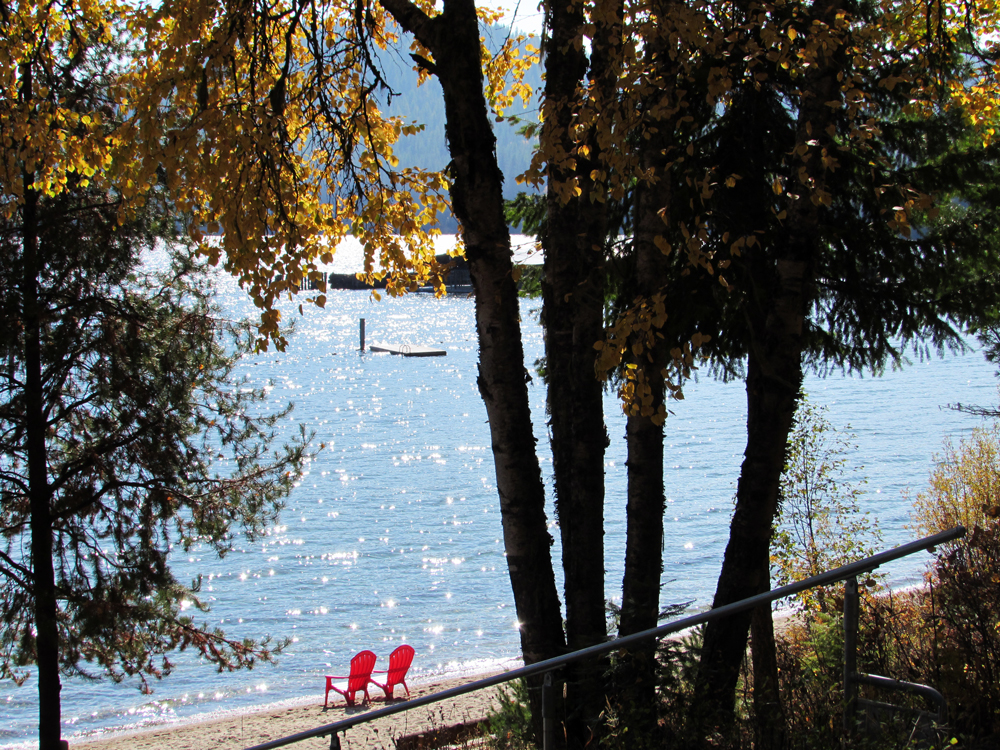
On the beach

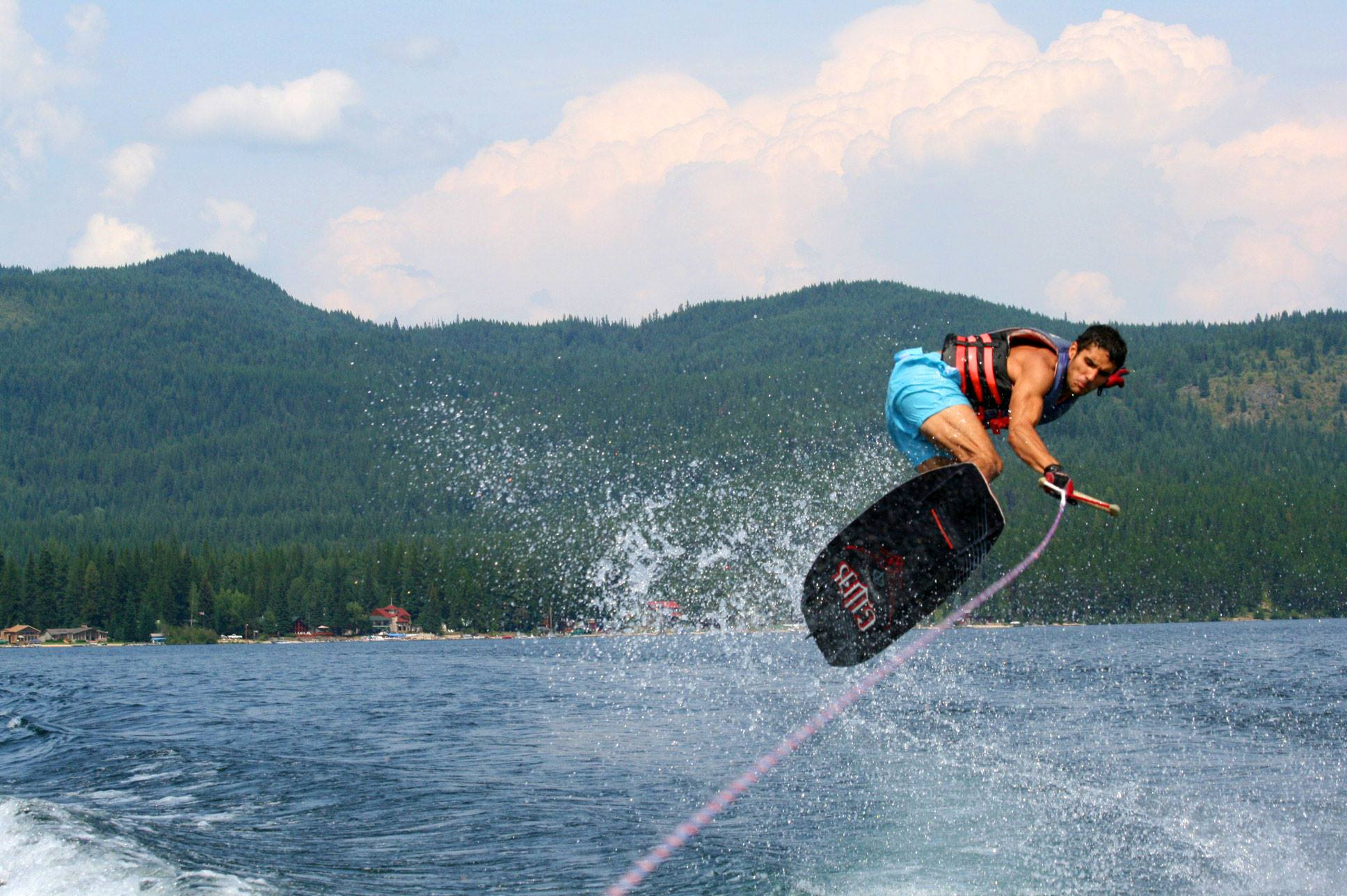
Wakeboarding

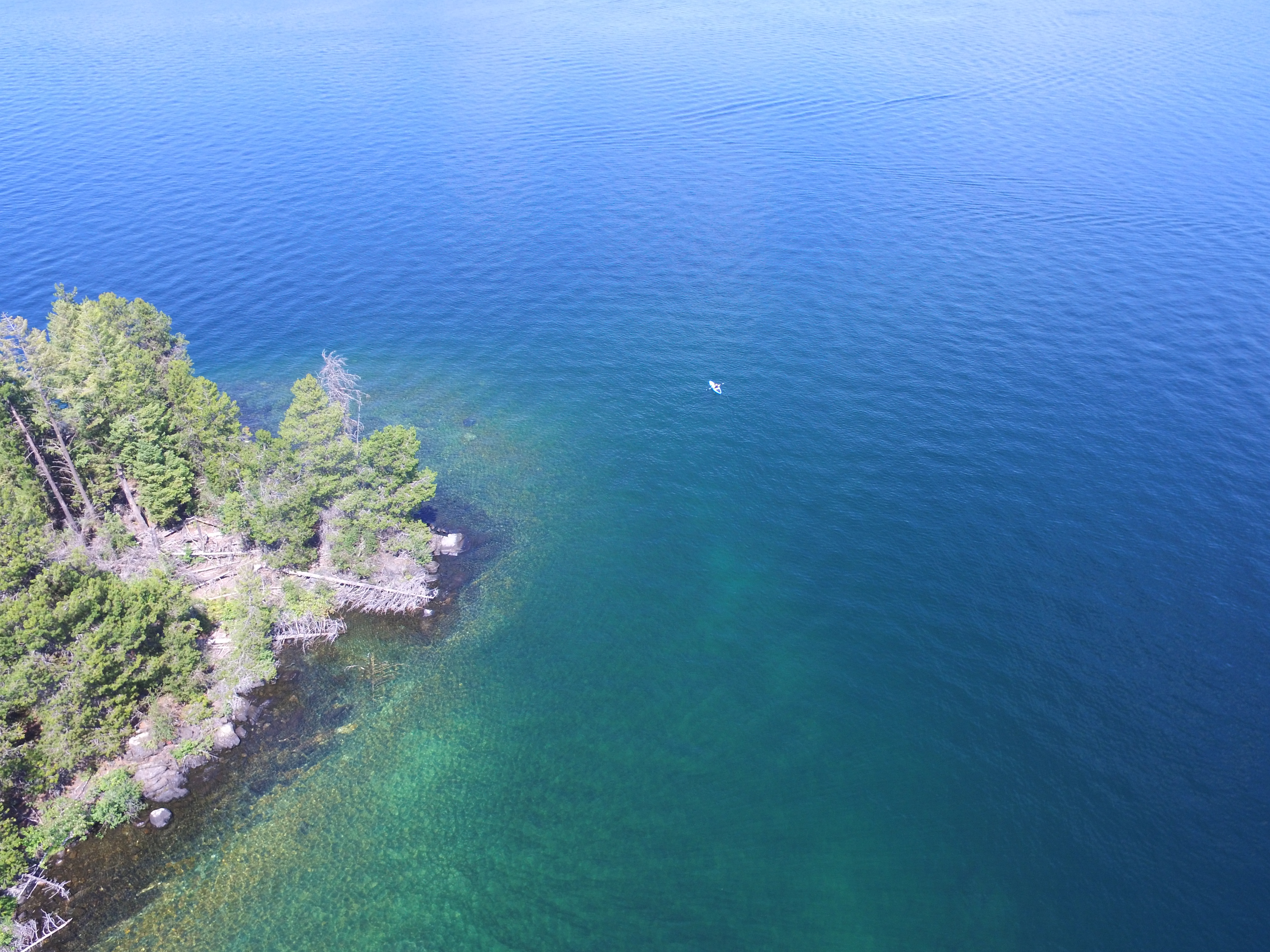
Papoose Island

== See also ==
- Priest River
