= American Redoubt =

Political migration movement

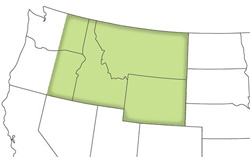
A map that shows the boundaries of the American Redoubt

The American Redoubt is a political migration movement first proposed in 2011 by survivalist novelist and blogger James Wesley Rawles which designates Idaho, Montana, and Wyoming along with eastern parts of Oregon and Washington, as a safe haven for conservative Christians. Rawles chose this area due to its low population density and lack of natural hazards.

It is difficult to measure how many people have been influenced by the proposal to move to these states; The Week estimated that anywhere from "hundreds" to "a few thousand" people may have come, although some may have moved for reasons of general cultural affinity rather than being directly influenced by Rawles's proposal.

In December 2019, Rawles published a list of "key leaders and promoters of the American Redoubt movement", including Montana pastor Chuck Baldwin, former Washington State Representative Matt Shea, and North Idaho Representative Heather Scott.

== Concept ==
Kim Murphy, a reporter for the Los Angeles Times, summed up one motivation for the movement: "For a growing number of people, it's the designated point of retreat when the American economy hits the fan. When banks fail, the government declares martial law, the power grid goes down." The same article identified Rawles as "the guru of the movement". Rawles claims that he is anti-racist and pro-Israel. According to an article in The Christian Century in 2012, Rawles compares the movement to the Puritan migration, saying that secession would be crushed, but people would "vote with their feet."

== Reception ==
In 2011, the American Redoubt concept was endorsed by 2008 Constitution Party presidential candidate Chuck Baldwin, who had relocated his entire extended family to western Montana. It also soon inspired the launch of a weekly podcast by Christian Libertarian journalist John Jacob Schmidt, called Radio Free Redoubt, and a volunteer network of amateur radio operators called AmRRON (the American Redoubt Radio Operators Network) established in 2012.

In February 2012, The Seattle Times characterized the American Redoubt movement as appealing to "a growing number of people" but concluded that as of that time "not all that many so far" had actually moved to the area. In April 2012, the business/arts columnist for The Ferry County View, a weekly newspaper in Republic, Washington (located inside the Redoubt region) was critical of the Redoubt movement, characterizing it as driven by fear. By contrast, in October 2013, The 700 Club aired a news segment that favored the American Redoubt relocation concept. In an aside, the news story mentioned how the growth of the movement has even inspired the minting of silver coins.

On October 14, 2013, Christian Broadcasting Network completed a featured television news segment and accompanying article on the American Redoubt titled Redoubt: Northwest a Haven for Dismayed Americans. In the article they noted "... Some conservative American Christians are so dismayed with direction of the country that they're looking for a safe place for their families. They call it the 'American Redoubt.'" Westbrook continued, "I think that people recognize that tough times are coming. And it's time to think about their situation, it's time to think about how they live now, and the security of their family, the stability of society and how they are going to relate to that ... But I'm finding something else, too." he continued. "That is that more and more people are resonating with this idea of getting back to the land, of living a simple, more natural way."

It is unclear how many people have moved because of the American Redoubt concept. In an interview on the Charles Carroll Society podcast in 2014, James Rawles estimated the number:

...well into the thousands, but it is difficult to quantify, because the vast majority of the people who are moving are preppers, who are by their nature very circumspect. However look at admittedly anecdotal evidence such as the growth of Pastor Chuck Baldwin's Liberty Fellowship church in Kalispell, Montana where the growth has been phenomenal, and many of the families are moving from far outside of the Redoubt states.

Rawles does not provide figures for what he terms "phenomenal" growth of the church, which meets at a local Hilton Garden Inn, according to the Church's website, but at his website, Baldwin mentions that some recent meetings were attended by more than 1,000 people.

The Southern Poverty Law Center says that "The American Redoubt is not a movement of overt white supremacists, and individuals who identify as Redoubters should not be seen as synonymous with racists," but that "it’s a concept clearly born out of antigovernment extremism — which itself is rooted in the Christian Identity-inspired Posse Comitatus of the 1970s…"

== Evolution of the movement ==
By 2016, Chris Carlson, a retired Democratic Party organizer, was comparing advocates of the American Redoubt to survivalists, with the difference being that the Redoubters have "become the shock troops for the Tea Party and openly support certain candidates." Carlson also claimed that the political migration to western states like Idaho, Montana and Wyoming has been driven by Redoubters seeking to be free from the federal government and that while they disavow racism, they have chosen a location where there are few racial minorities.

An August 2016 article about the movement in The Economist magazine mentioned that "thousands of families" have now migrated to the American Redoubt and that the movement is "quietly gaining steam." Indeed, the election of Donald Trump has spurred on the movement. In 2017 the Inlander said "But increasingly, they [Preppers] see more political violence in big cities, and more of a divide between rural and urban environments. The left's reaction to Donald Trump's presidency, they feel, has deepened the divide, making the day they've been preparing for seem ever more imminent."

In a Chicago Tribune article by Kevin Sullivan on August 27, 2016, noted:

It is impossible to know exactly how many people have come over the past few years, but newcomers, real estate agents, local officials and others said it was in the hundreds, or perhaps even a few thousand, across all five states. Here, they live in a pristine place of abundant water and fertile soil, far from urban crime, free from most natural disasters and populated predominantly by conservative, mostly Christian people with a live-and-let-live ethos and local governments with a light regulatory touch and friendly gun laws.

== Political influence ==
It has been asserted that Republican Party politics in Idaho's northernmost legislative district have been pulled farther to the right with the arrival of conservative Christian "preppers" fleeing more populated states. In 2014, two ultraconservative state legislators were elected from the district: Reps. Heather Scott, R-Blanchard, and Sage Dixon, R-Ponderay. In 2016, state senator Shawn Keough, R-Sandpoint – an 8-time incumbent and a moderate Republican from one of the most conservative areas of Idaho – faced a hard primary challenge, but went on to win the general election.

== Media ==
James Rawles's blog SurvivalBlog.com regularly covers Redoubt news and focuses on preparedness "how to" guides. John Jacob Schmidt's blog Radio Free Redoubt and his radio show The John Jacob Schmidt Show, transmitted on the American Christian Network (ACN) and KTW 630 AM out of Spokane, Washington, carries news and commentary often focused on the American Redoubt. Similarly, the online outlet, Redoubt News publishes news and opinion relevant to Christian conservative culture in the American Redoubt. Another prominent leader, Chuck Baldwin, a radio host and politician, promotes the Confederacy and conspiracy theories.

== See also ==
- Adelsverein
- Free State Project
- Lincoln (proposed Northwestern state)
- List of active separatist movements in North America
- List of U.S. state partition proposals
- National redoubt
- Northwest Territorial Imperative
- Return to the Land
