= Idaho's 1st legislative district =

- A map of the 1st legislative district
Senator
Jim Woodward; R–Bonners Ferry
since 2024
Representative
Mark Sauter; R
since 2022
Cornel Rasor; R
since 2024
- Demographics: 97.75% White; 0.17% Black; 2.59% Hispanic; 1.01% Native American; 0.46% Other
- Population (2020): 53,610
- Registered voters (2025): 37,375

Idaho's 1st legislative district is one of 35 districts of the Idaho Legislature. It currently comprises Boundary County, as well as part of Bonner County.

It is currently represented by State Senator Jim Woodward, Republican of Sagle, Representative Mark Sauter, Republican of Sandpoint, and Representative Cornel Rasor, Republican of Sagle.

== District overview ==
=== Party affiliation ===
Party affiliation as of August 17, 2021
Party	Registered	% (from 2018)
Republican	20,636 (from 14,980)	60.92% (from 55.45%)
Unaffiliated	8,894 (from 9,176)	26.26% (from 33.97%)
Democratic	3,780 (from 2,467)	11.16% (from 9.13%)
Libertarian	349 (from 233)	1.03 (from 0.86%)
Constitution	216 (from 158)	0.64% (from 0.58%)
Total	33,875 (up from 27,014)	100%

=== Cities ===
City	County	Population
Bonners Ferry	Boundary	3,223
Clark Fork	Bonner	640
Dover	Bonner	739
East Hope	Bonner	255
Hope	Bonner	91
Kootenai	Bonner	814
Moyie Springs	Boundary	823
Oldtown	Bonner	223
Ponderay	Bonner	1,168
Priest River	Bonner	1,649
Sandpoint	Bonner	7,414

=== School districts ===
- Boundary County School District 101
- Lake Pend Oreille School District 84
- Lakeland Joint School District 272
- West Bonner County School District 83

== List of senators and representatives ==
=== 1984–1992 ===
From 1984 to 1992, District 1 consisted of all of Bonner and Boundary counties.

Legislature	Session	Senate	House Seat A	House Seat B
48th (1984 - 1986)	1st	Kermit Kiebert (D)	Tim Tucker (D)	Jim Stoicheff (D)
48th (1984 - 1986)	2nd	Kermit Kiebert (D)	Tim Tucker (D)	Jim Stoicheff (D)
49th (1986 - 1988)	1st	Kermit Kiebert (D)	Tim Tucker (D)	Jim Stoicheff (D)
49th (1986 - 1988)	2nd	Steve Herndon (D)	Tim Tucker (D)	Jim Stoicheff (D)
50th (1988 - 1990)	1st	Karen Cooke (D)	Tim Tucker (D)	Jim Stoicheff (D)
50th (1988 - 1990)	2nd	Tim Tucker (D)	Monica Beaudoin (D)	Jim Stoicheff (D)
51st (1990 - 1992)	1st	Tim Tucker (D)	Monica Beaudoin (D)	Jim Stoicheff (D)
51st (1990 - 1992)	2nd	Tim Tucker (D)	Monica Beaudoin (D)	Jim Stoicheff (D)

=== 1992–2002 ===
From 1992 to 2002, District 1 consisted of Boundary County and a portion of Bonner County.

Legislature	Session	Senate	House Seat A	House Seat B
52nd (1992 - 1994)	1st	Tim Tucker (D)	Monica Beaudoin (D)	Jim Stoicheff (D)
52nd (1992 - 1994)	2nd	Tim Tucker (D)	Dean Stevens (D)	Jim Stoicheff (D)
53rd (1994 - 1996)	1st	Tim Tucker (D)	Carol Pietsch (D)	Jim Stoicheff (D)
53rd (1994 - 1996)	2nd	Tim Tucker (D)	Carol Pietsch (D)	Jim Stoicheff (D)
54th (1996 - 1998)	1st	Shawn Keough (R)	John Campbell (R)	Jim Stoicheff (D)
54th (1996 - 1998)	2nd	Shawn Keough (R)	John Campbell (R)	Jim Stoicheff (D)
55th (1998 - 2000)	1st	Shawn Keough (R)	John Campbell (R)	Jim Stoicheff (D)
55th (1998 - 2000)	2nd	Shawn Keough (R)	John Campbell (R)	Jerry Stoicheff (D)
56th (2000 - 2002)	1st	Shawn Keough (R)	John Campbell (R)	George Eskridge (R)
56th (2000 - 2002)	2nd	Shawn Keough (R)	John Campbell (R)	George Eskridge (R)

=== 2002–2012 ===
From 2002 to 2012, District 1 consisted of Boundary County and a portion of Bonner County.

Legislature	Session	Senate	House Seat A	House Seat B
57th (2002 - 2004)	1st	Shawn Keough (R)	John Campbell (R)	George Eskridge (R)
57th (2002 - 2004)	2nd	Shawn Keough (R)	John Campbell (R)	George Eskridge (R)
58th (2004 - 2006)	1st	Shawn Keough (R)	Eric Anderson (R)	George Eskridge (R)
58th (2004 - 2006)	2nd	Shawn Keough (R)	Eric Anderson (R)	George Eskridge (R)
59th (2006 - 2008)	1st	Shawn Keough (R)	Eric Anderson (R)	George Eskridge (R)
59th (2006 - 2008)	2nd	Shawn Keough (R)	Eric Anderson (R)	George Eskridge (R)
60th (2008 - 2010)	1st	Shawn Keough (R)	Eric Anderson (R)	George Eskridge (R)
60th (2008 - 2010)	2nd	Shawn Keough (R)	Eric Anderson (R)	George Eskridge (R)
61st (2010 - 2012)	1st	Shawn Keough (R)	Eric Anderson (R)	George Eskridge (R)
61st (2010 - 2012)	2nd	Shawn Keough (R)	Eric Anderson (R)	George Eskridge (R)

=== 2012–2022 ===
From 2012 to 2022, District 1 consisted of Boundary County and a portion of Bonner County.

Legislature	Session	Senate	House Seat A	House Seat B
62nd (2012 - 2014)	1st	Shawn Keough (R)	Eric Anderson (R)	George Eskridge (R)
62nd (2012 - 2014)	2nd	Shawn Keough (R)	Eric Anderson (R)	George Eskridge (R)
63rd (2014 - 2016)	1st	Shawn Keough (R)	Heather Scott (R)	Sage Dixon (R)
63rd (2014 - 2016)	2nd	Shawn Keough (R)	Heather Scott (R)	Sage Dixon (R)
64th (2016 - 2018)	1st	Shawn Keough (R)	Heather Scott (R)	Sage Dixon (R)
64th (2016 - 2018)	2nd	Shawn Keough (R)	Heather Scott (R)	Sage Dixon (R)
65th (2018 - 2020)	1st	Jim Woodward (R)	Heather Scott (R)	Sage Dixon (R)
65th (2018 - 2020)	2nd	Jim Woodward (R)	Heather Scott (R)	Sage Dixon (R)
66th (2020 - 2022)	1st	Jim Woodward (R)	Heather Scott (R)	Sage Dixon (R)
66th (2020 - 2022)	2nd	Jim Woodward (R)	Heather Scott (R)	Sage Dixon (R)

=== 2022–present ===
District 1 currently consists of Boundary County and a portion of Bonner County.

Legislature	Session	Senate	House Seat A	House Seat B
67th (2022 - 2024)	1st	Scott Herndon (R)	Mark Sauter (R)	Sage Dixon (R)
67th (2022 - 2024)	2nd	Scott Herndon (R)	Mark Sauter (R)	Sage Dixon (R)
68th (2024- 2026)	1st	Jim Woodward (R)	Mark Sauter (R)	Cornel Rasor (R)

== Senator elections ==
=== Primary elections ===
==== Republican ====
Year	Winning candidate	Votes	Pct	2nd place candidate	Votes	Pct	Total votes
2016	Shawn A. Keough	4,141	55.7%	Glenn Rohrer	3,291	44.3%	7,432
2014	Shawn A. Keough	3,484	53.8%	Danielle Ahrens	2,997	46.2%	6,481
2012	Shawn A. Keough	4,671	70.3%	Danielle Ahrens	1,976	29.7%	6,647
2010	Shawn A. Keough	4,280	76.4%	Steve Tanner	1,325	23.6%	5,605
2008	Shawn A. Keough	3,795	74.0%	Donald T. Heckel	1,334	26.0%	5,129
2006	Shawn A. Keough	3,866	100.0%				3,866
2004	Shawn A. Keough	4,116	100.0%				4,116
2002	Shawn A. Keough	3,656	100.0%				3,656
2000	Shawn A. Keough	4,890	76.3%	Lisa Tanner	1,516	23.7%	6,406
1998	Shawn A. Keough	3,163	100.0%				3,163
1996	Shawn A. Keough	2,819	60.0%	Eugene R. Brown	1,884	40.0%	4,703
1994							0
1992							0
1990	Albert Erval Rainey	1,844	100.0%				1,844

==== Democratic ====
Year	Winning candidate	Votes	Pct	2nd place candidate	Votes	Pct	Total votes
2016	Steve Tanner	549	100.0%				549
2014							0
2012	Laura Bry	425	100.0%				425
2010							0
2008	Lew Langness	85	100.0%				85
2006	Jim Ramsey	882	100.0%				882
2004	Patty Palmer	1,207	100.0%				1,207
2002	Gary L. Pietsch	1,207	100.0%				1,207
2000	Steve Johnson	830	100.0%				830
1998							0
1996	Tim Tucker	1,425	79.3%	Ed Worzala	373	20.7%	1,798
1994	Tim Tucker	2,476	64.0%	Ron Smith	1,393	36.0%	3,869
1992	Tim Tucker	1,207	100.0%				3,263
1990	Tim Tucker	3,317	100.0%				3,317

==== Constitution ====
Year	Winning candidate	Votes	Pct	2nd place candidate	Votes	Pct	Total votes
2014	Christian Fioravanti	32	82.1%	Jack Mervin	7	17.9%	39

=== General elections ===
Republican Party
Democratic Party
Constitution Party
Libertarian Party

Year	Winning candidate	Votes	Pct	2nd place candidate	Votes	Pct	3rd place candidate	Votes	Pct	Total votes
2016	Shawn Keough	17,264	76.3%	Steve Tanner	5,365	23.7%				22,629
2014	Shawn Keough	8,993	65.0%	Christian Fioravanti	4,834	35.0%				13,827
2012	Shawn Keough	17,217	100.0%							17,217
2010	Shawn Keough	11,593	100.0%							11,593
2008	Shawn Keough	15,322	100.0%							15,322
2006	Shawn Keough	9,308	68.6%	Jim Ramsey	4,265	31.4%				13,573
2004	Shawn Keough	12,630	75.1%	Patty Douglas Palmer	4,177	24.9				16,807
2002	Shawn Keough	7,904	71.6%	Gary L. Pietsch	3,133	28.4%				12,675
2000	Shawn Keough	11,413	73.4%	Steve Johnson	3,635	23.4%	Frank Reichert	496	3.2%	15,544
1998	Shawn Keough	9,957	100.0%							9,957
1996	Shawn Keough	9,427	59.1%	Tim Tucker	6,513	40.9%				15,940
1994	Tim Tucker	8,833	100.0%							8,833
1992	Tim Tucker	11,506	100.0%							11,506
1990	Tim Tucker	6,430	57.6%	Albert Erval Rainey	4,725	42.4%				11,155

== House Seat A elections ==
=== Primary elections ===
==== Republican ====
Year	Winning candidate	Votes	Pct	2nd place candidate	Votes	Pct	3rd place candidate	Votes	Pct	Total votes
2016	Heather Scott	5,601	100.0%							5,601
2014	Heather Scott	4,128	63.8%	Stephen T. Snedden	2,343	36.2%				6,471
2012	Eric Anderson	4,090	63.9%	Donna Capurso	1,886	29.5%	Louis (Louie) Kins	419	6.6%	6,395
2010	Eric Anderson	4,418	100.0%							4,418
2008	Eric Anderson	3,225	70.9%	Daniel Lawrence	1,325	29.1%				4,550
2006	Eric Anderson	3,369	100.0%							3,369
2004	Eric Anderson	3,392	100.0%							3,392
2002	John L. Campbell	3,184	100.0%							3,184
2000	John L. Campbell	4,856	100.0%							4,856
1998	John L. Campbell	2,753	100.0%							2,753
1996	John L. Campbell	3,528	100.0%							3,528
1994										0
1992	Nancy Thorpe	81	100.0%							81
1990	C.W. Bill Pogue	1,660	100.0%							1,660

==== Democratic ====
Year	Winning candidate	Votes	Pct	2nd place candidate	Votes	Pct	Total votes
2016	Kate McAlister	940	100.0%				940
2014	Laura Bry	523	69.8%	Steve Tanner	226	30.2%	749
2012	Andrew C Sorg	412	100.0%				412
2010							0
2008	Steve Elgar	1,406	100.0%				1,406
2006	Steve Elgar	917	100.0%				917
2004	Steve Elgar	1,315	100.0%				1,315
2002	Dale Van Stone	1,308	100.0%				1,308
2000	Jerry Stoicheff	914	100.0%				914
1998	Monica E. Beaudoin	1,529	100.0%				1,529
1996	Harvey Rush Balison	1,435	100.0%				1,435
1994	Carol Pietsch	2,820	100.0%				2,820
1992	Monica Beaudoin	3,035	100.0%				3,035
1990	Monica Beaudoin	2,734	100.0%				2,734

== See also ==
- List of Idaho senators
- List of Idaho representatives
