= Idaho State Highway 200 =

State highway in Bonner County, Idaho, United States

State Highway 200
- Pend Oreille National Scenic Byway
- SH-200 highlighted in red

Route information
- Maintained by ITD
- Length: 33 mi (53 km)
- Existed: c. 1968–present
- Tourist routes: Pend Oreille Scenic Byway

Major junctions
- West end: US 2 / US 95 in Ponderay
- East end: MT 200 near Clark Fork

Location
- Country: United States
- State: Idaho
- Counties: Bonner

Highway system
- Idaho State Highway System; Interstate; US; State
← SH-167	→ SH-1

State Highway 200 (SH-200) is an east–west state highway in northern Idaho, United States. It travels along the north side of Lake Pend Oreille and the Clark Fork River between the Sandpoint area and the Montana border, where it continues as Montana Highway 200. The highway is also a national scenic byway that is named the Pend Oreille Scenic Byway. This state highway is part of a continuous chain of similarly numbered state highways that stretch approximately 1,356 miles (2,182 km) from Minnesota to Idaho.

== Route description ==
Idaho SH-200 starts at a junction with U.S. Highway 95 in Ponderay, a small community north of Sandpoint. The highway heads eastward along the north shores of lake Pend Oreille at the very feet of the Cabinet Mountains with several turnouts and scenic overlooks. After the town of Clark Fork it then enters the Clark Fork River Valley following the Clark Fork River and ends at the Montana border just before Heron, MT where it becomes Montana Highway 200.

The road passes through the towns of Ponderay, Kootenai, Hope, East Hope, and Clark Fork.

ID-200 is the westernmost portion of a chain of Highway 200s which extends east through Montana, North Dakota, and Minnesota. At only 33 miles (53 km) in length, Idaho's Highway 200 is the shortest in the chain while Montana's Highway 200 is the longest. There is another highway called SR 20 in Washington that would complete the chain of Hwy 200s, but ID-200 is no longer directly connected to WA-20.

== History ==
SH-200 was originally part of the National Parks Highway, a national auto trail created in the early 20th century to connect various national parks. In the 1930s, it was designated as State Highway 3, corresponding with the Montana highway's number. From 1941 to 1967, the route was signed as part of U.S. Route 10A. After that highway's decommissioning, Idaho State Highway 200 was created in 1968 to replace it as part of a multi-state effort to renumber highways on the Spokane–Duluth corridor to the same number. By 2007, the portion of Highway 200 west of the US 2/95 intersection had been terminated. Mileposts still display its pre-2007 length.

== Major intersections ==
The entire route is in Bonner County.

Location	mi	km	Destinations	Notes
Ponderay	29.740	47.862	US 2 / US 95 – Bonners Ferry, Sandpoint, Coeur d'Alene, Spokane	
Hope	44.610	71.793	SH-200 Bus.	
East Hope	46.160	74.287	SH-200 Bus.	
	63.118	101.579	MT 200	Continuation into Montana
1.000 mi = 1.609 km; 1.000 km = 0.621 mi

== Business route ==
State Highway 200 Business
- Location: Hope
- Length: 1.58 mi (2.54 km)

State Highway 200 Business (SH-200 BUS) is a business route of Highway 200 that runs through Hope, Idaho. It follows the former route of US 10A.

== See also ==
- List of state highways in Idaho
- List of highways numbered 200
