= Carderock Division of the Naval Surface Warfare Center =

Division of the U.S. Naval Surface Warfare Center

Coordinates: 38°58′30″N 77°11′30″W

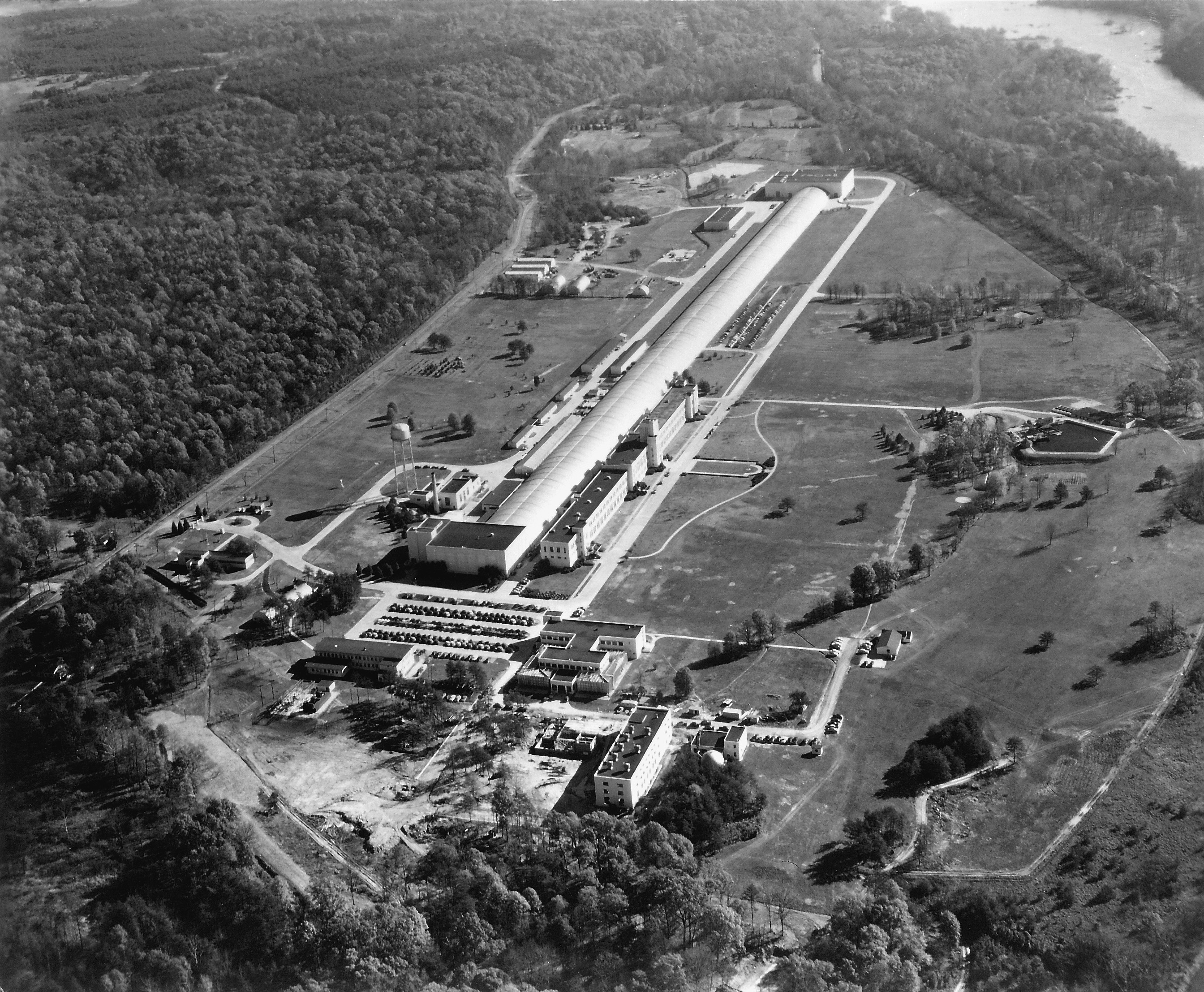
David Taylor Model Basin, circa 1946

The Carderock Division of the Naval Surface Warfare Center is one of eight Naval Sea Systems Command (NAVSEA) Surface Warfare Centers. The headquarters, located in Carderock, Maryland, includes the historic David Taylor Model Basin. The division includes remote sites across the United States concentrating on engineering, testing and modelling ship and ship's systems for the Navy. It has about 3,200 scientists, engineers, and support personnel working in more than 40 disciplines from fundamental science to applied and in-service engineering.

== Description ==
As a major component and field activity of the Naval Sea Systems Command, the Carderock Division provides cradle-to-grave support for its technical products over a wide range of scientific areas related to surface and undersea platforms. The Division addresses the full spectrum of applied maritime science and technology, from the theoretical and conceptual beginnings, through design and acquisition, to implementation and follow-on engineering. This includes all technical aspects of improving the performance of ships, submarines, military water craft, and unmanned vehicles, as well as research for military logistics systems. In addition, the Division is uniquely chartered by the U.S. Congress to support maritime industry. The facility specializes in:

- Environmental Quality Systems;
- Hull Forms & Propulsors;
- Ship Design & Integration;
- Signatures,
- Silencing Systems,
- Structures and Materials;
- Susceptibility.

The facility also hosts a NASAMS surface-to-air missile battery as part of the air defense of Washington, D.C.

== Carderock Division sites ==
- Carderock Division Headquarters, Bethesda, Maryland.

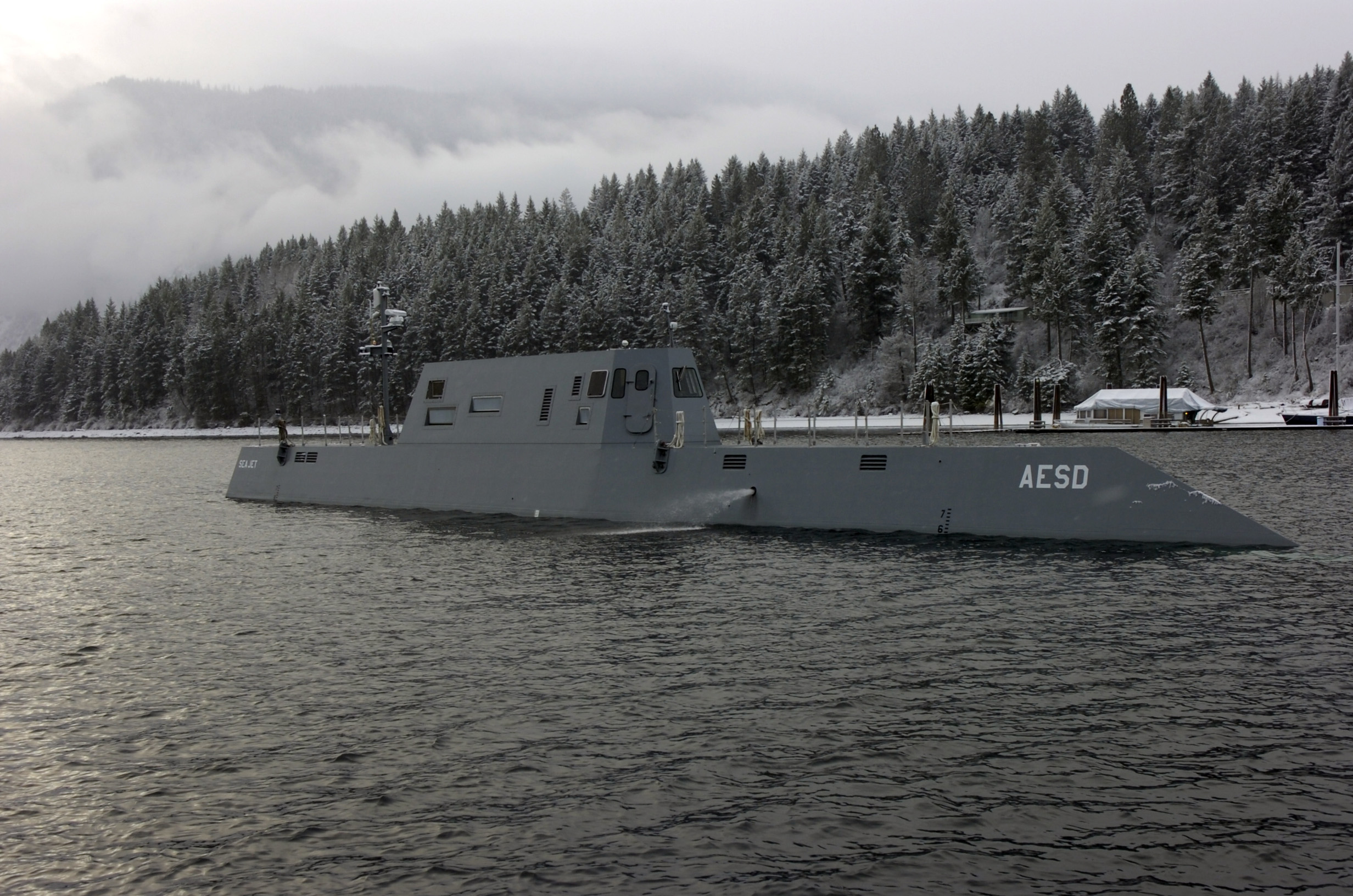
The Advanced Electric Ship Demonstrator on Lake Pend Oreille in northern Idaho in 2005; Acoustic Research Detachment

- Acoustic Research Detachment (ARD), Bayview, Idaho, on Lake Pend Oreille uses the quiet, 1,150-foot (350 m) deep lake for Research, Development, Test & Evaluation of submarine stealth technology using large models, acoustic test facilities and ranges. The facility also works with full scale acoustic transducer calibration. During World War II, Bayview hosted the sizable Farragut Naval Training Station.
- Acoustic Trials Detachment, Titusville, Florida, is the U.S. location managing and supporting the South Tongue of the Ocean (TOTO) Acoustic Measurement Facility (STAFAC) at the Atlantic Undersea Test and Evaluation Center (AUTEC) in the Bahamas. AUTEC is part of Naval Sea Systems Command's Naval Undersea Warfare Center
- Detachment Puget Sound, Silverdale, Washington, at Naval Base Kitsap provides west coast acoustic trials and the Southeast Alaska Acoustic Measurement Facility with management and logistic support.
- Combatant Craft Division (CCD), Norfolk, Virginia, supports Navy and other government agencies in engineering, design, testing and evaluation of high performance watercraft.
- Memphis Detachment, Memphis, Tennessee, engaged in Research, Design, Testing and Engineering using the Large Cavitation Channel (LCC), a high-speed, variable-pressure water tunnel capable of testing ship and submarine propellers.
- South Florida Ocean Measurement Facility (SFOMF), Fort Lauderdale, Florida, operates test ranges specializing in magnetic detection and electromagnetic signature testing related to mine warfare.
- Southeast Alaska Acoustic Measurement Facility (SEAFAC), Ketchikan, Alaska, makes high fidelity passive acoustic signature measurements of radiated noise for quieting programs. A unique feature allows suspending a submarine between barges on cables to measure radiated noise not related to underway hull and propeller noise. Those measurements may be directed to individual machinery noise with all other systems shut down.

== History ==
The facility was previously known as the David W. Taylor Naval Ship Research and Development Center; it was renamed "David Taylor Research Center (DTRC)" in 1987 and later became the "Carderock Division of the Naval Surface Warfare Center" in 1992.

== See also ==
- Carderock, Maryland
- Olney Support Center
