= Pack River =

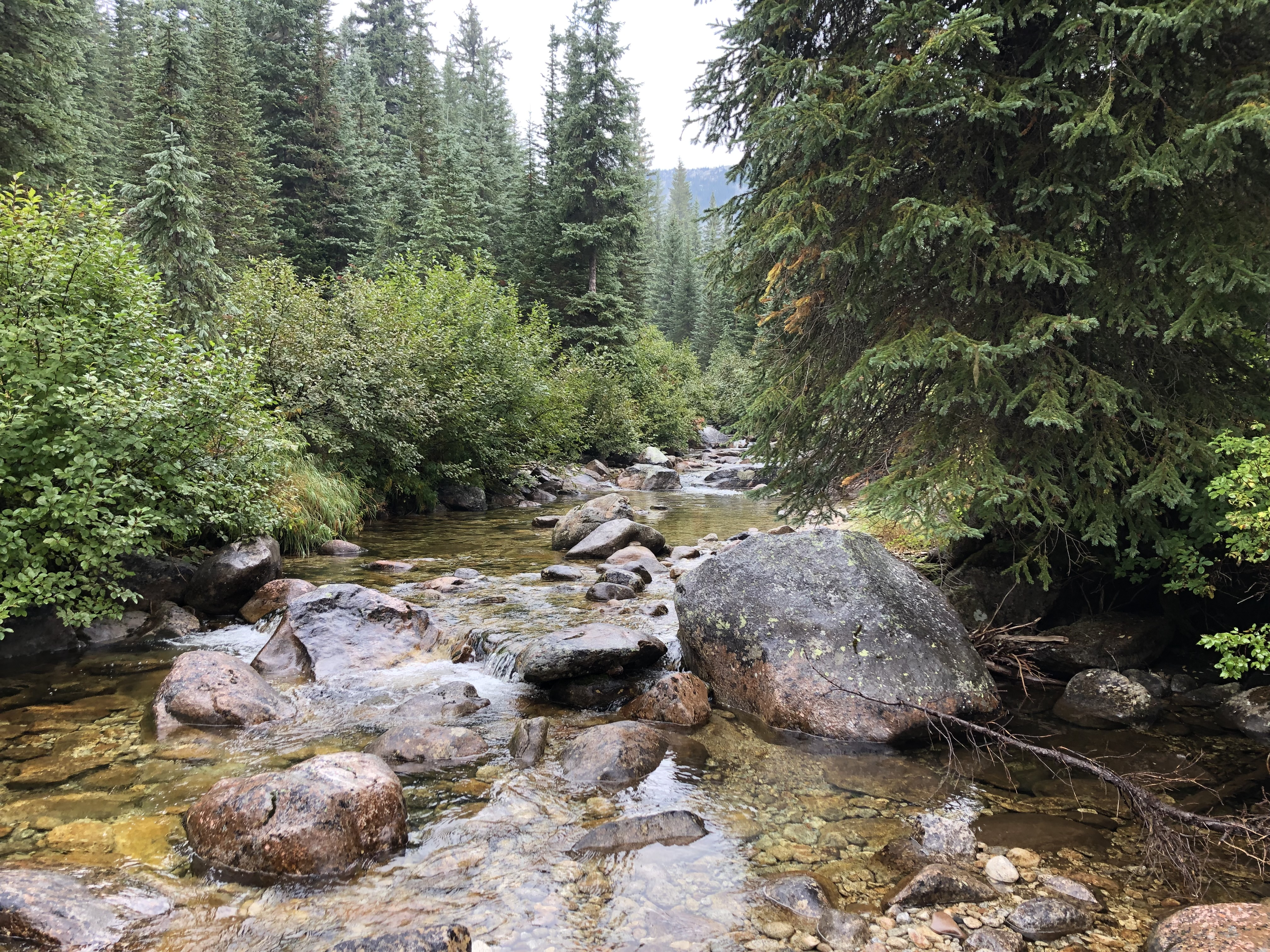
- The Pack River near the confluence with Beehive Creek

- Location of the mouth of the Pack River in Idaho Pack River (the United States)

Location
- Country: United States

Physical characteristics
- Source
  - location: Harrison Lake, Selkirk Mountains 48°40′38.91″N 116°39′19.34″W
  - elevation: 6,190 feet (1,890 m)
- Mouth
  - location: Lake Pend Oreille 48°17′18.71″N 116°22′10.61″W
  - elevation: 2,050 feet (620 m)
- Length: 40 miles (64 km)
- Basin size: 290 square miles (750 km^{2})
- Discharge
  - average: 344 cubic feet per second (9.7 m^{3}/s)

Basin features
- Progression: Northwest-southeast
- River system: Columbia River
- Tributaries
  - left: Zuni Creek, Torrent Creek, Zee Creek, Pearson Creek, Martin Creek, Blanc Creek, Tavern Creek, Unnamed Creek, Sand Creek, Grouse Creek, Gold Creek, Rapid Lightning Creek, Trout Creek, Kirby Creek, Trestle Creek
  - right: Upper Beehive Lake Drainage, Beehive Creek, Slide Creek, West Branch Pack River, McCormick Creek, Homestead Creek, Jeru Creek, Lindsey Creek, Hellroaring Creek, Caribou Creek, French Creek, Colburn Creek

The Pack River is a medium-sized river located in Northern Idaho. It is about 40 miles (64 km) long and drains a high mountainous area of the Idaho Panhandle's Rocky Mountains and Selkirk Mountains. The river flows into Lake Pend Oreille and is part of the Columbia River watershed via the Pend Oreille River.

== Course ==
Its headwaters originate in the Selkirk Mountains, and flow in a southerly direction to the river's mouth at the northern tip of Lake Pend Oreille. It is the second largest tributary to the lake, after the Clark Fork River.

== Watershed ==
The Pack River basin drains approximately 185,600 acres (751 km^{2}). Watershed elevation ranges from a high of 7,550 feet (2,300 m) to a low point of 2,050 feet (620 m) at the lake, with a basin-wide average elevation of 3,730 ft. The upper portion of the watershed is mostly forested, and managed by the U.S. Forest Service. The lower watershed is under mixed public and private ownership, and supports a variety of uses.

Mean annual precipitation in the basin is 35.8 inches (910 mm), much of which falls as winter snow in the mountains. Mean annual river flow at a mid-river gage is 344 cubic feet per second (9.7 m^{3}/s), with the highest mean monthly flows occurring in May (939 ft³/s) and the lowest mean monthly flow in September (54.7 ft³/s). Peak river flows for a 100-year event exceed 4,150 cubic feet per second (118 m^{3}/s). Pack River and its tributaries often experience more than one run-off event per year. Mid-winter rain-on-snow events can result in rapid snow melt, and in some years the peak flow from tributary watersheds occurs during these events. Following the 56,000 acres (230 km^{2}) Sundance wildfire in 1967, removal of the forest canopy was hypothesized to have produced an increase in annual stream flow from the basin and an advance of the peak flows by virtue of decreased transpiration losses and earlier snowmelt runoff generation.

== Tributaries ==
The Pack River has about 34 tributaries. Grouse Creek is the biggest, followed by Rapid Lightning Creek, Jeru Creek, and Hellroaring Creek. These along with the West Branch of the Pack River are the crucial streams forming the River's size.

== Geology ==
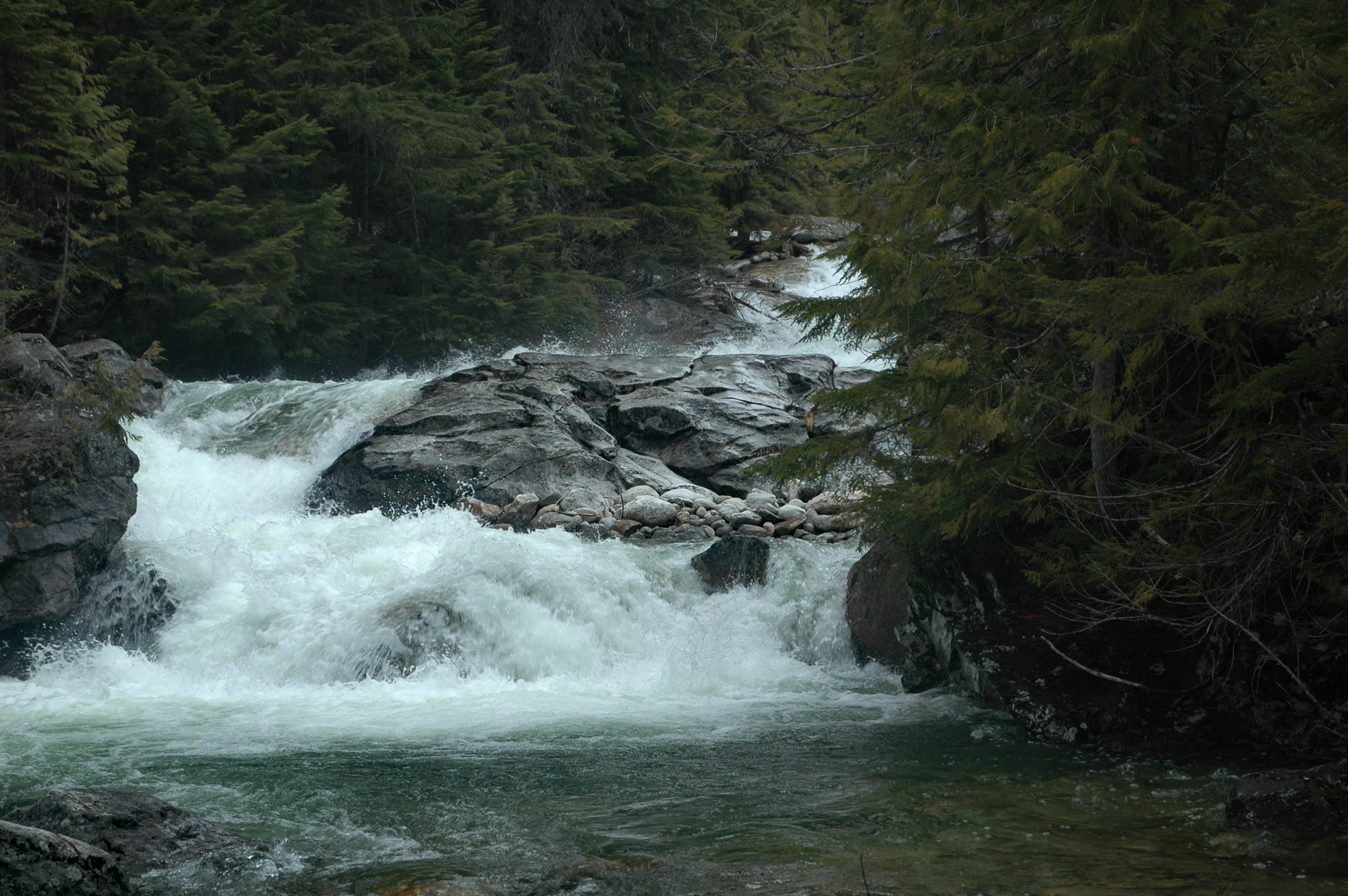
Rocks creating rapids on the river

The underlying geology in the Pack River watershed is largely granitic, which decomposes into fine particles. Glaciation in the Pack River valley formed ice dams upstream of the confluence of many tributaries, resulting in large deposits of glacial till. Fine sandy sediments deposited in the dammed water are known as glacial fluvial deposits. These sandy areas today appear on mountain side slopes, forming very erosive soils.

Because of the high potential for sediment delivery to the Pack River, land use practices such as road building, timber harvesting, grazing, agriculture, and residential development must be carefully managed. Any loss of riparian vegetation and associated root masses can result in delivery of fine sediment to the stream channel.

== Ecology ==
The Pack River watershed is home to a number of species protected by the Endangered Species Act. Bull trout, a threatened species, hatch in the upper river, and migrate the length of the river to grow upwards of 30 inches in Lake Pend Oreille before returning as adults to spawn again in the upper river. Terrestrial species found here include the endangered woodland caribou and grey wolf, and threatened species grizzly bear, Canada lynx, and bald eagle. Idaho wildlife species of special concern supported by the Pack River watershed include the wolverine, fisher, northern goshawk, and the white-winged crossbill.

Other relatively abundant wildlife species that rely on this watershed include westslope cutthroat and brook trout, kokanee salmon, white-tailed deer, mule deer, moose, elk, black bear, mountain lion, mountain goat, river otter, mink, muskrat, beaver, osprey, peregrine falcon, turtles, a variety of hawks and owls, migratory songbirds and waterfowl, several species of game birds, and many other wetland species.

Near the mouth of the river is the Pack River Flats Wildlife Management Area managed by the Idaho Department of Fish and Game, located 9 miles (14 km) east-northeast of the town of Sandpoint and 4 miles (6 km) northwest of the town of Hope. The Pack River Flats is home to a wide variety of wildlife. Canada geese nest on the platforms in the marsh. Geese, swans, and ducks congregate here in spring and fall during their migration. This area also provides public access to wildlife viewing, hunting, and fishing. The Pack River Flats is important ecologically to moose, deer, elk, and waterfowl. Although there is currently no active eagle nesting here, eagles come to the area in the winter to feed on carrion and waterfowl. Before completion of Albeni Falls Dam on the Pend Oreille River in 1952, the lake level dropped after the spring runoff. Pack River Flats was a natural meadow then, and archaeological evidence suggests that it was historically an important site for Native Americans.

== Recreation ==
The Pack River supports numerous recreational pursuits. Fishing, kayaking, canoeing, and river floating are common activities. To protect the river environment and reduce conflicts with other recreationists, motorized watercraft are prohibited above the Highway 200 bridge. In the watershed, hiking, hunting, snowmobiling, rock climbing, and wildlife viewing opportunities abound.

The Pack River Watershed Council was formed in 2001 to coordinate watershed restoration projects along the river.
