= Olney Support Center =

Coordinates: 39.2093°N 77.1063°W

The Olney Support Center, formerly the Olney Federal Support Center, is an underground facility of the Carderock Division of the U.S. Naval Surface Warfare Center (NSWC) located in Montgomery County, Maryland, United States. The center occupies 75 acres (30 ha) of property 2.0 miles (3.2 km) east of Laytonsville, Maryland, on the site of a former Project Nike base (W-93, launch area). The NSWC acquired the facility from the Federal Emergency Management Agency (FEMA) in March 2019.

Prior to its acquisition by the NSWC, the center was a communications, satellite teleregistration and data network facility. It at one time housed the FEMA Alternate Operations Center (FAOC) as a control center for the U.S. National Warning System. It was also part of the FEMA National Radio System (FNARS), a high-frequency radio network that links FEMA's emergency operations centers.
