= Sea Jet =

Naval testbed funded by the U.S. Navy's Office of Naval Research

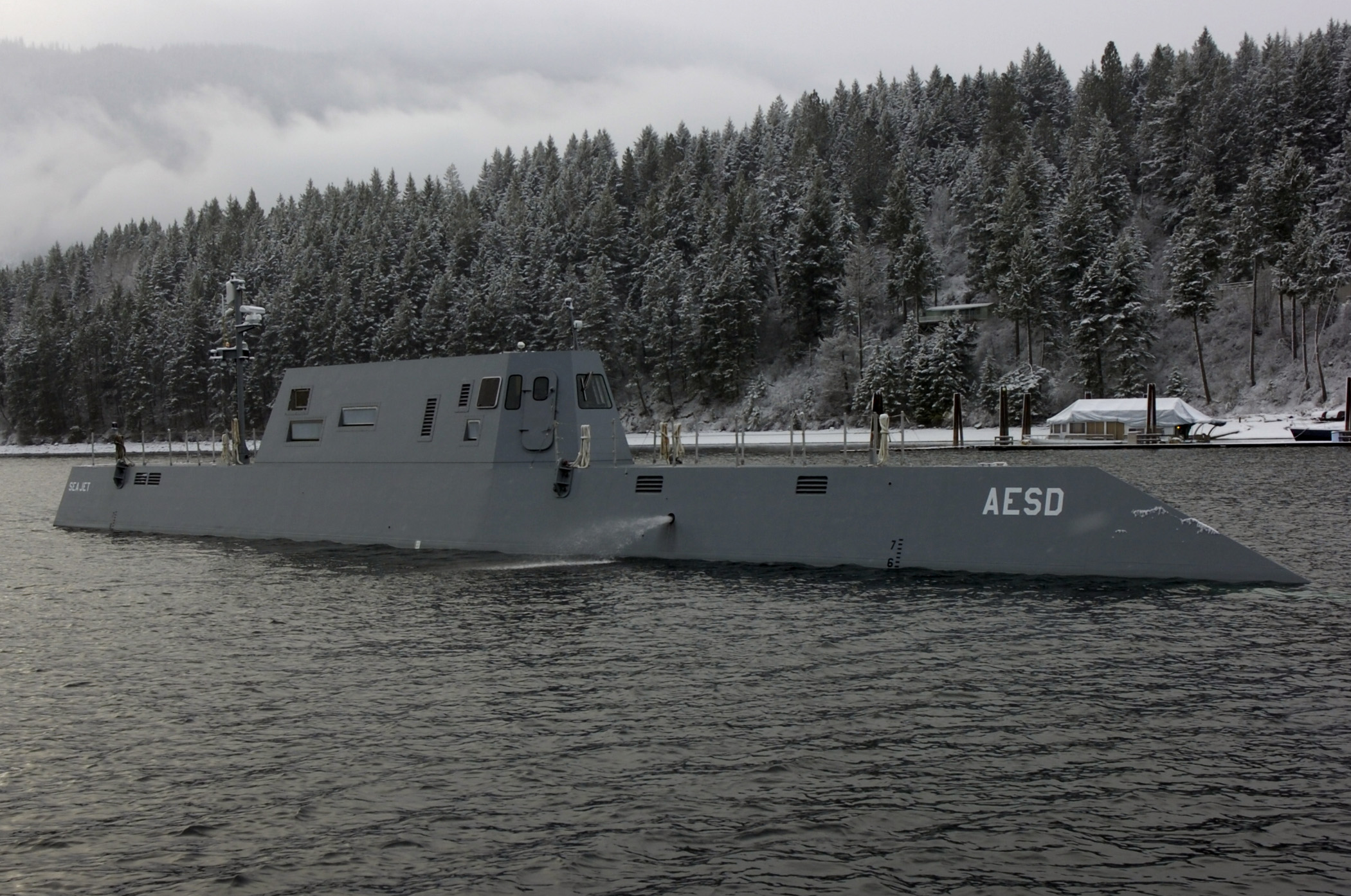
- Sea Jet, an Advanced Electric Ship Demonstrator

History

United States
- Name: Sea Jet
- Christened: 24 August 2005
- In service: December 2005
- Status: Active

General characteristics
- Type: Experimental testbed
- Displacement: 239,900 lb (108,800 kg)
- Length: 133 ft (41 m)
- Propulsion: RIMJET
- Speed: Diesel: 8 kn (15 km/h; 9.2 mph); Electric: 16 kn (30 km/h; 18 mph)
- Armament: None

Sea Jet, or Advanced Electric Ship Demonstrator (AESD), is a naval testbed funded by the U.S. Navy's Office of Naval Research. The 133-foot (41 m) vessel is operated out of the Carderock Division's Acoustic Research Detachment in Bayview, Idaho.

Sea Jet was operated on Lake Pend Oreille, where she was used for test and demonstration of various technologies. Among the first technologies tested was an underwater discharge water jet from Rolls-Royce Naval Marine, Inc., called AWJ-21, a propulsion concept with the goals of providing increased propulsive efficiency, reduced acoustic signature, and improved maneuverability over previous Destroyer Class combatants.

Sea Jet demonstrated a few technologies that were integrated into the Zumwalt-class destroyer. Notable among these is the use of the tumblehome hull design.

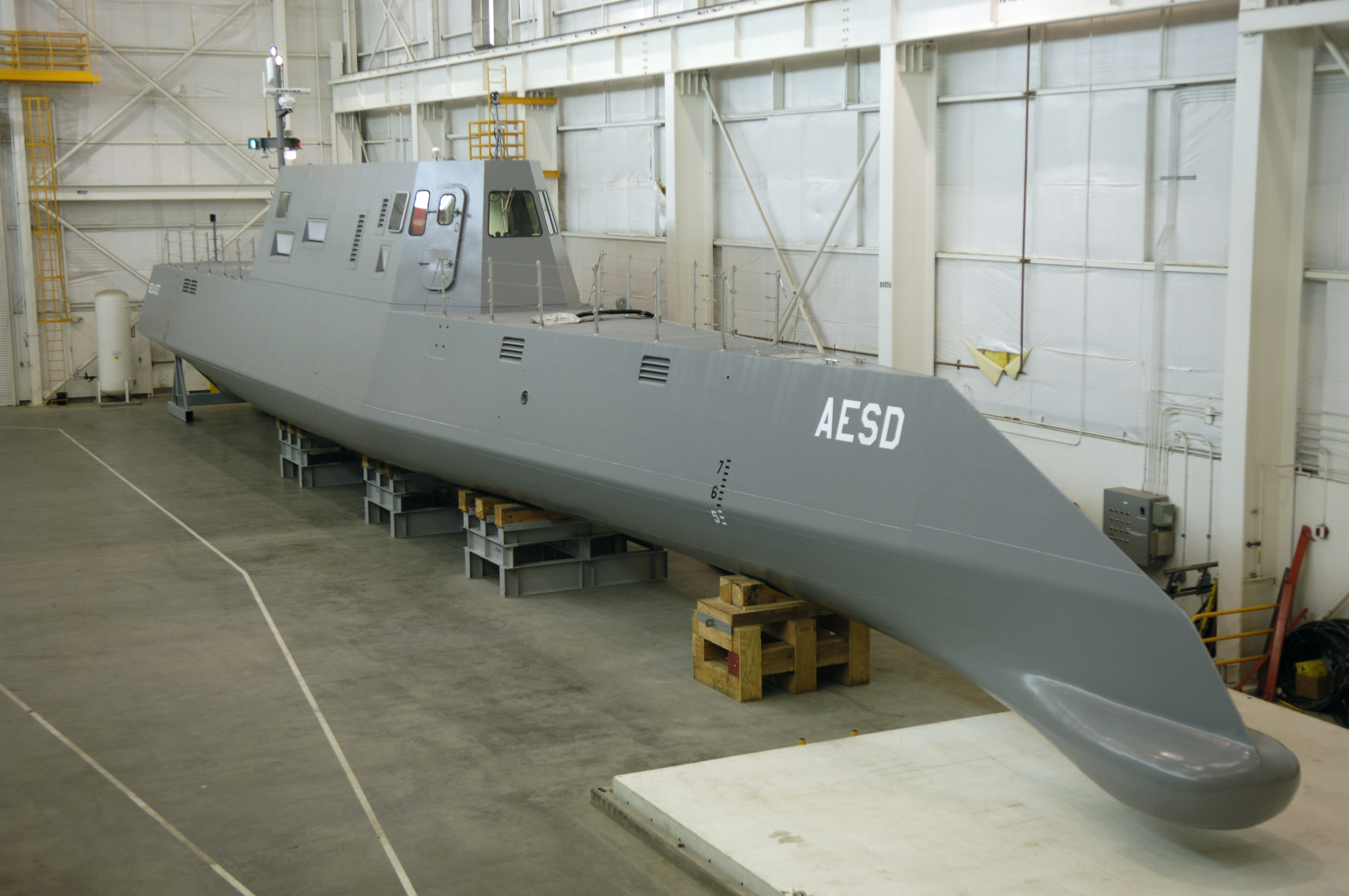
Sea Jet out of the water and showing the unique hull design
