= Eric Anderson (Idaho politician) =

American politician from Idaho

Member of the Idaho House of Representatives from District 1 Seat A
- In office December 1, 2004 – November 30, 2014
- Preceded by: John Campbell
- Succeeded by: Heather Scott

Personal details
- Born: Eric R. Anderson; May 31, 1956 (age 70) Spokane, Washington, U.S.
- Party: Republican
- Education: Eastern Washington University
- Profession: Owner, Priest Lake Construction

Eric R. Anderson (born May 31, 1956 in Spokane, Washington) was a Republican member of the Idaho State Representative representing District 1 in the A seat from 2004 to 2014.

== Early life, education, and career ==
Anderson earned his bachelor's degree in political science and government from Eastern Washington University.

== Idaho House of Representatives ==
=== Committee assignments ===
- Commerce and Human Resources Committee from 2004-2006
- Environment, Energy, and Technology Committee from 2004-2014
- State Affairs Committee from 2004-2014
- Business Committee from 2006-2008
- Resources and Conversation Committee from 2012-2014
- Ways and Means Committee from 2012-2014, serving as chairman

== Elections ==
District 1 - Boundary County and part of Bonner County
Year	Candidate	Votes	Pct	Candidate	Votes	Pct	Candidate	Votes	Pct
2004 Primary	Eric Anderson	3,392	100%						
2004 General	Eric Anderson	8,399	50.2%	Steve Elgar	7,538	45.0%	Frank Reichert	810	4.8%
2006 Primary	Eric Anderson (incumbent)	3,369	100%						
2006 General	Eric Anderson (incumbent)	6,869	50.9%	Steve Elgar	6,634	49.1%			
2008 Primary	Eric Anderson (incumbent)	3,225	70.9%	Daniel Lawrence	1,325	29.1%			
2008 General	Eric Anderson (incumbent)	10,030	54.4%	Steve Elgar	8,404	45.6%			
2010 Primary	Eric Anderson (incumbent)	4,418	100%						
2010 General	Eric Anderson (incumbent)	10,978	100%						
2012 Primary	Eric Anderson (incumbent)	4,090	63.9%	Donna Capurso	1,886	29.5%	Louis Kins	419	6.6%
2012 General	Eric Anderson (incumbent)	13,599	71.0%	Andrew Sorg	5,567	29.0%			
