= Cornel Rasor =

American politician

Cornel Rasor is an American politician who has represented district 1B in the Idaho House of Representatives since his appointment in September 2024. He replaced Sage Dixon, who resigned to accept a role as regional director for the Idaho Department of Health and Welfare. Raser received his appointment from Governor Brad Little and was endorsed by the Bonner County Republican Party.

== Early life and education ==
Rasor was born in Jackson, California and received an undergraduate degree from North Idaho College and the University of Idaho. As a high school student at Sandpoint High School in Idaho, he was a member of the Future Farmers of America. He grew up on a cattle ranch.

== Political career ==
In 2013, Rasor attracted national attention after remarking that he'd "hire a gay guy if I thought he was a good worker. But if he comes to work in a tutu … he’s not producing what I want in my office.”.

In 2026, Rasor sponsored Idaho legislation that would punish transgender individuals who used bathrooms intended for the other "biological sex" by up to one year in prison.

=== 2020 State House of Representatives Candidacy ===
Cornel Rasor announced his candidacy to represent District 7B in the Idaho House of Representatives on May 2nd, 2020. He expressed strong support for the second amendment and faced Charlie Shepherd in the Republican Party primary election on June 2, 2020. Rasor was narrowly defeated by Shepherd, receiving 48% of the vote to Shepherd's 52%

Idaho House of Representatives District 7B Republican primary, 2020
Party	Candidate	Votes	%
Republican	Charlie Shepherd	4,414	52.1%
Republican	Cornel Rasor	4,051	47.9%
Total votes		8,465	100%

=== 2024 State House of Representatives Candidacy ===
Raser filed paperwork to run for District 1B in the Idaho House of Representatives in late 2023 and officially declared his candidacy in May of 2024. He narrowly defeated Chuck Lowman in the Republican primary, winning by a margin of 4%. Rasor was endorsed by the Bonner Country Republican Party.

Idaho House of Representatives District 1B Republican primary, 2024
Party	Candidate	Votes	%
Republican	Cornel Rasor	7,623	52.0%
Republican	Chuck Lowman	7,042	48.0%
Total votes		8,465	100%

==== Appointment ====
Shortly after the Republican primary, incumbent Representative Sage Dixon announced he would resign his House position in order to accept a regional director for the Idaho Department of Health and Welfare. Governor Brad Little officially appointed Rasor to the seat on September 30, 2024.
