= George Eskridge =

American politician from Idaho

Member of the Idaho House of Representatives from the District 1, seat B district
- In office December 1, 2000 – November 30, 2014
- Preceded by: Jerry Stoicheff
- Succeeded by: Sage Dixon

Personal details
- Born: January 1, 1943 (age 83) Bonners Ferry, Idaho
- Party: Republican
- Education: University of Montana

Military service
- Branch/service: United States Navy
- Years of service: 1962–1966

George E. Eskridge (born January 1, 1943) was a Republican Idaho State Representative from 2001 to 2014 representing District 1 in the B seat.

== Early life, education, and career ==
Eskridge graduated from Sandpoint High School, served four years as a sailor in the United States Navy, and then earned his bachelor's degree in business administration from the University of Montana.

== Elections ==
District 1 - Boundary County and part of Bonner County
Year	Candidate	Votes	Pct	Candidate	Votes	Pct
2000 Primary	George Eskridge	4,364	100%			
2000 General	George Eskridge	8,153	53.5%	Jerry Stoicheff (incumbent)	7,093	46.5%
2002 Primary	George Eskridge (incumbent)	3,268	100%			
2002 General	George Eskridge (incumbent)	7,019	65.0%	Sandra Lamson	3,786	35.0%
2004 Primary	George Eskridge (incumbent)	3,756	100%			
2004 General	George Eskridge (incumbent)	13,233	100%			
2006 Primary	George Eskridge (incumbent)	3,579	100%			
2006 General	George Eskridge (incumbent)	8,382	62.76%	Bob Wynhausen	4,973	37.24%
2008 Primary	George Eskridge (incumbent)	4,242	100%			
2008 General	George Eskridge (incumbent)	11,651	64.2%	Tom Hollingsworth	6,494	35.8%
2010 Primary	George Eskridge (incumbent)	4,627	100%			
2010 General	George Eskridge (incumbent)	11,191	100%			
2012 Primary	George Eskridge (incumbent)	4,368	66.9%	Pam Stout	2,161	33.1%
2012 General	George Eskridge (incumbent)	16,412	100%			
2014 Primary	George Eskridge (incumbent)	2,995	46.5 %	Sage Dixon	3,444	53.5 %
