= Boundary Dam =

Dam in Washington (state), United States

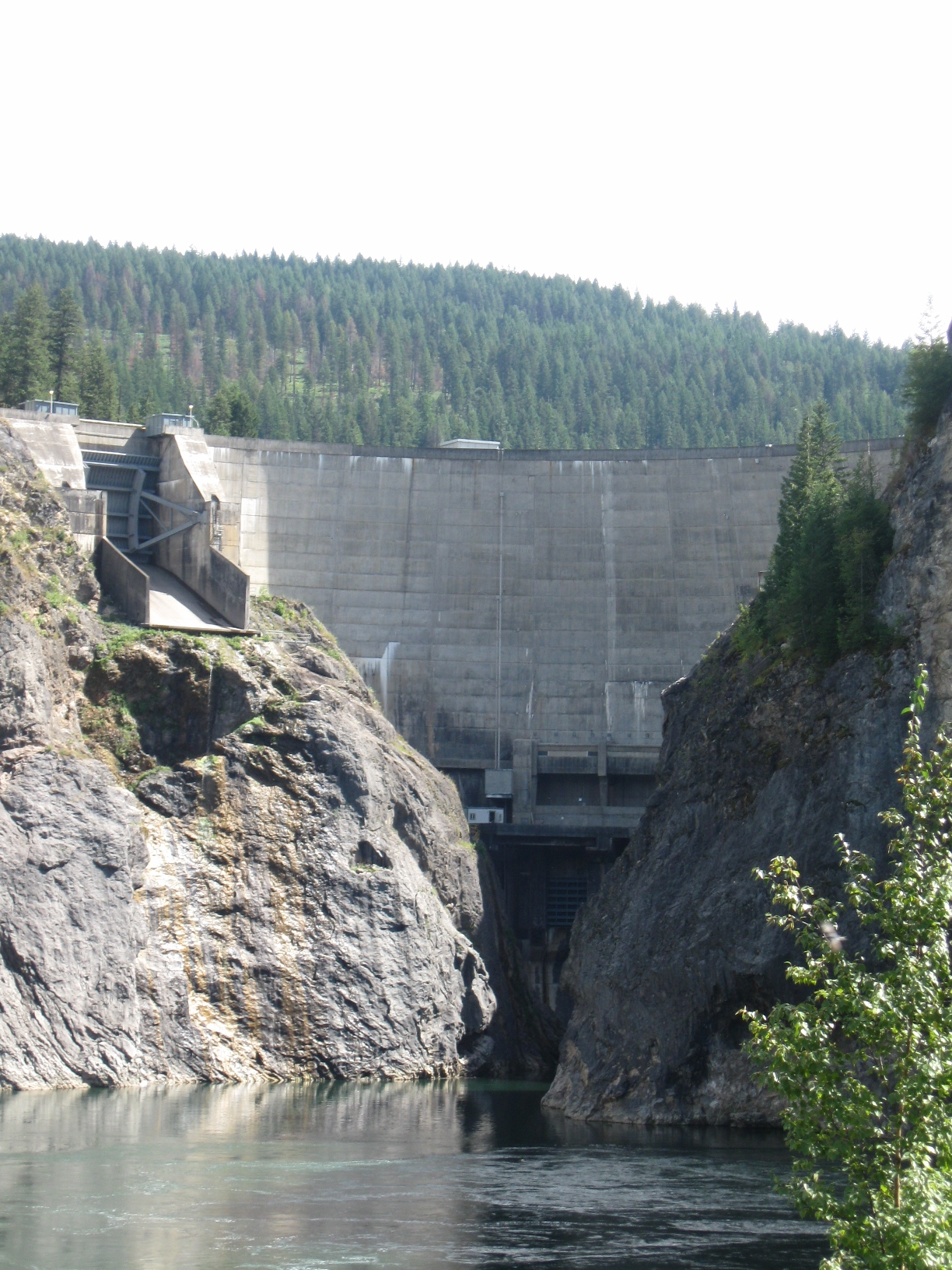

- Location of the dam in Washington
- Country: United States
- Location: Pend Oreille County, Washington
- Coordinates: 48°59′14″N 117°20′51″W
- Purpose: Power
- Status: Operational
- Opening date: 1967
- Owner: City of Seattle

Dam and spillways
- Type of dam: Arch-gravity
- Impounds: Pend Oreille River
- Height: 338 ft (103 m)
- Length: 740 ft (225.6 m)
- Width (crest): 8.0 ft (2.44 m)
- Width (base): 32.0 ft (9.75 m)
- Spillways: 2

Reservoir
- Total capacity: 95,000 acre⋅ft (117 GL)
- Catchment area: 25,200 sq mi (65,000 km^{2})
- Surface area: 1,668 acres (675 ha)

Boundary Dam Hydro Power Plant
- Coordinates: 48°59′14″N 117°20′51″W
- Operator: Seattle City Light
- Commission date: 1967 (units 51-54); 1986 (units 55 and 56)
- Type: Conventional
- Turbines: 2x 239.4 MW; 2x 180.5 MW; 1x 161.5 MW; 1x 158.4 MW; (all Francis-type)
- Installed capacity: 1,159.7 MW (1.5552×10^{6} hp)
- Annual generation: 3,020 GWh (10,900 TJ) (2024)

The Boundary Dam is a concrete arch-gravity dam across the Pend Oreille River, located in the U.S. state of Washington, in the northeast corner of the state. Completed in 1967 for the conventional generation of hydroelectricity, the dam is operated by Seattle City Light and generates a significant portion of the City of Seattle's energy portfolio. On average, it provides between 46 and 60 percent of the power generated by Seattle City Light.

The dam wall is 338 feet (103 m) high and 738 feet (225 m) long.

The underground powerhouse, called the Boundary Dam Hydro Power Plant, is completely built inside of the rock that makes up the left abutment of the dam wall. It has a nameplate capacity of just over 1 gigawatt (1,300,000 hp) of generation. The hydroelectric project was listed on the National Register of Historic Places in 2018.

The 1997 film The Postman was partially filmed at the dam. A facade of the town (Bridge City in the film) appeared on the face of the dam for a period of time that year.

== Hydroelectric power capacity ==
Generator (all Francis-type)	Nameplate capacity		Brand	Commissioned
Generator (all Francis-type)	MW	hp	Brand	Commissioned
51	180.5	242,100	General Electric	October 1967
52	161.5	216,600	General Electric	August 1967
53	158.4	212,400	General Electric	September 1967
54	180.5	242,100	General Electric	August 1967
55	239.4	321,000	Toshiba	November 1985
56	239.4	321,000	Toshiba	May 1986
Total (Note: Other sources give total capacity of 1,003 MW (1.345×10^{6} hp) and 1,039.8 MW (1.3944×10^{6} hp).)	1,159.7	1,555,200		

== Climate ==
Climate data for Boundary Dam, Washington, 1991–2020 normals: 1837ft (560m)
Month	Jan	Feb	Mar	Apr	May	Jun	Jul	Aug	Sep	Oct	Nov	Dec	Year
Mean daily maximum °F (°C)	32.6 (0.3)	38.3 (3.5)	47.5 (8.6)	58.0 (14.4)	67.2 (19.6)	72.4 (22.4)	83.6 (28.7)	84.6 (29.2)	72.9 (22.7)	55.7 (13.2)	40.3 (4.6)	32.2 (0.1)	57.1 (13.9)
Daily mean °F (°C)	26.7 (−2.9)	29.9 (−1.2)	37.1 (2.8)	45.3 (7.4)	54.0 (12.2)	60.1 (15.6)	67.8 (19.9)	67.2 (19.6)	57.8 (14.3)	45.2 (7.3)	34.2 (1.2)	26.8 (−2.9)	46.0 (7.8)
Mean daily minimum °F (°C)	20.9 (−6.2)	21.5 (−5.8)	26.8 (−2.9)	32.6 (0.3)	40.9 (4.9)	47.8 (8.8)	52.0 (11.1)	49.8 (9.9)	42.6 (5.9)	34.6 (1.4)	28.1 (−2.2)	21.4 (−5.9)	34.9 (1.6)
Average precipitation inches (mm)	3.10 (79)	1.98 (50)	2.35 (60)	2.21 (56)	2.60 (66)	3.18 (81)	1.42 (36)	0.81 (21)	1.32 (34)	2.40 (61)	3.23 (82)	3.60 (91)	28.2 (717)
Average snowfall inches (cm)	18.50 (47.0)	7.70 (19.6)	3.40 (8.6)	0.10 (0.25)	0.00 (0.00)	0.00 (0.00)	0.00 (0.00)	0.00 (0.00)	0.00 (0.00)	0.10 (0.25)	6.80 (17.3)	18.20 (46.2)	54.8 (139.2)
Source: NOAA

== See also ==
- List of dams in the Columbia River watershed
