= Pend Oreille River =

River in Canada and the United States

Pend Oreille Pend-d'Oreille, Clark Fork
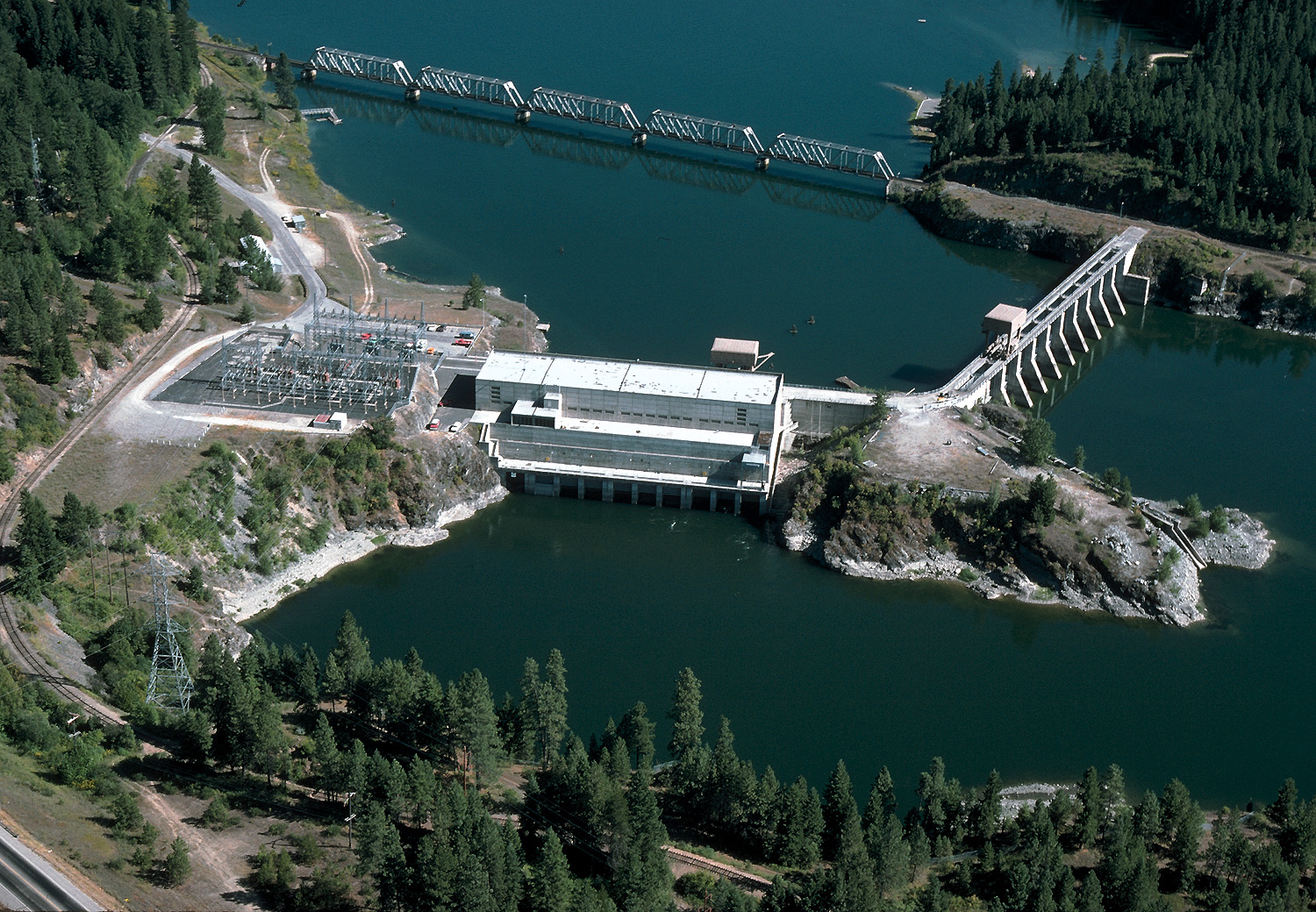
- Albeni Falls Dam on the Pend Oreille River

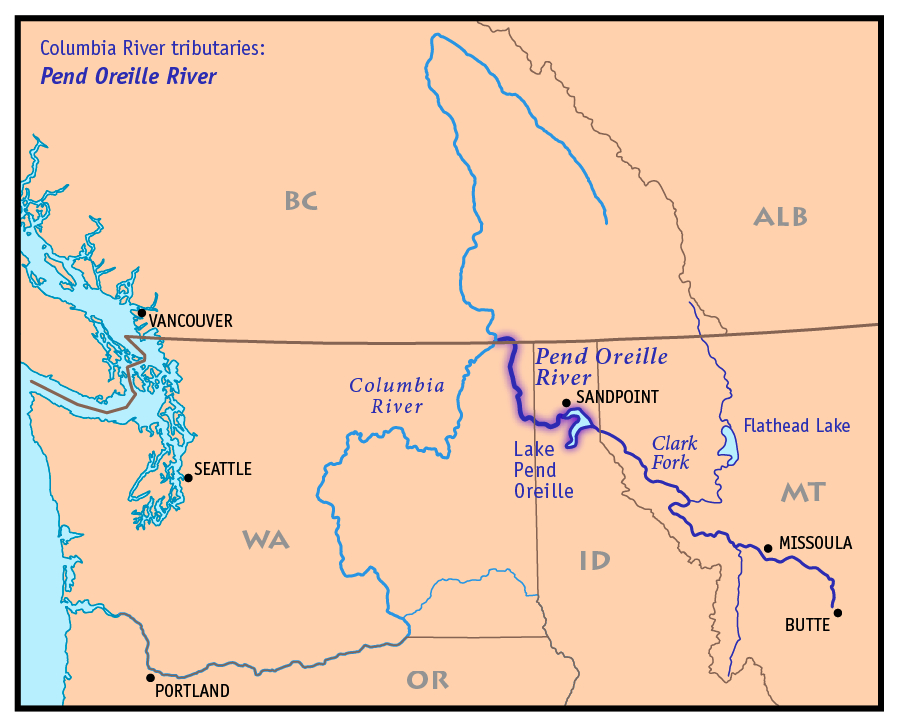
- Map of the Pend Oreille River and its main tributaries.

Location
- Country: United States, Canada
- State: Washington, Idaho
- Province: British Columbia
- City: Sandpoint, ID

Physical characteristics
- Source: Lake Pend Oreille
  - location: Idaho
  - coordinates: 48°14′20″N 116°36′25″W
  - elevation: 2,064 ft (629 m)
- Mouth: Columbia River
  - location: British Columbia
  - coordinates: 49°0′13″N 117°37′13″W
  - elevation: 1,371 ft (418 m)
- Length: 130 mi (210 km)
- Basin size: 25,792 sq mi (66,800 km^{2})
- Discharge
  - location: below Box Canyon Dam, 34.3 miles (55.2 km) from the mouth
  - average: 26,320 cu ft/s (745 m^{3}/s)
  - minimum: 82 cu ft/s (2.3 m^{3}/s)
  - maximum: 167,000 cu ft/s (4,700 m^{3}/s)

Basin features
- Tributaries
  - right: Clark Fork, Pack River, Priest River, Salmo River

The Pend Oreille River (/ˌpɒndəˈreɪ/ POND-ə-RAY) is a tributary of the Columbia River, approximately 130 miles (209 km) long, in northern Idaho and northeastern Washington in the United States, as well as southeastern British Columbia in Canada. In its passage through British Columbia its name is spelled Pend-d'Oreille River. It drains a scenic area of the Rocky Mountains along the U.S.-Canada border on the east side of the Columbia. The river is sometimes defined as the lower part of the Clark Fork, which rises in western Montana. The river drains an area of 66,800 square kilometres (25,792 sq mi), mostly through the Clark Fork and its tributaries in western Montana and including a portion of the Flathead River in southeastern British Columbia. The full drainage basin of the river and its tributaries accounts for 43% of the entire Columbia River Basin above the confluence with the Columbia. The total area of the Pend Oreille basin is just under 10% of the entire 258,000-square-mile (670,000 km^{2}) Columbia Basin.

== Course ==
The Pend Oreille River begins at Lake Pend Oreille in Bonner County, Idaho in the Idaho Panhandle, draining the lake from its western end near Sandpoint (The Clark Fork River enters the lake from its eastern end). It flows west, receiving the Priest River from the north at the town of Priest River, then flows into southern Pend Oreille County in northeastern Washington at Newport. Once in Washington it turns north, flowing along the eastern side of the Selkirk Mountains. It flows roughly parallel to the Idaho border for approximately 50 miles (80 km), through the Colville National Forest, past Tiger and Metaline Falls. It crosses the international border into southeastern British Columbia, looping west for about 15 miles (24 km) and joining the Columbia from the east, approximately 0.2 miles (0.32 km) north of the international border and approximately 5 miles (8 km) south of Montrose.

== Watershed ==
Spreading across 25,792 square miles (66,800 km^{2}), the Pend Oreille River watershed stretches across most of western Montana, northern Idaho and northeastern Washington, as well as tiny portions in southern British Columbia drained by the North Fork Flathead River and the lower Pend Oreille River. Much of the southern drainage divide of the watershed forms the border of Idaho and Montana, and a very short portion of the northeastern divide forms the border of British Columbia and Alberta. The river is sometimes considered as one with the Clark Fork, which is the primary river flowing into Lake Pend Oreille. For example, in Stewart Holbrook's book The Columbia, he repeatedly refers to the Pend Oreille River as the Clark Fork. If the lengths of the North Fork Flathead, main Flathead, Clark Fork and Pend Oreille are added together, the total is over 510 miles (820 km) stretching from the Rocky Mountains north of Glacier National Park to the Canada-U.S. border south of Montrose, British Columbia. This makes the Pend Oreille system the second longest tributary of the Columbia River (after the Snake River). It is the fourth largest by discharge (after the Snake, Kootenay and Willamette Rivers) and drains the second largest area (second only to the Snake).

The Pend Oreille River watershed divide is formed on the east side by the Continental Divide. On the south, the Spokane River and Snake River drainage basins border on the Clark Fork. To the west smaller rivers such as the Colville River and tributaries of the Spokane drain the lands past the watershed divide. In the north is the Kootenay River, a similar-sized tributary of the Columbia. To the east, in Montana, is the Missouri River and tributaries such as the Marias River and Milk River. In the southwest the watershed borders on the Big Hole River and Jefferson River, headwater streams of the Missouri. The Pend Oreille/Clark Fork system is notable in that it cuts right between the Bitterroot Range and Selkirk Range, two major chains of the Rocky Mountains. The only other river to do so is the Kootenay, just to the north. The Rocky Mountain Trench runs across the northeast part of the watershed, through the Flathead Valley, and eventually terminating in mountains near the Clark Fork's confluence with the Flathead.

== Tributaries ==
The Pend Oreille River starts in northern Idaho, at Lake Pend Oreille, Idaho's largest lake. Cocolalla Creek is the first major tributary. The next one is the Priest River, this is 68 miles (109 km) long, and has three rivers flowing into it. Sullivan Creek is the last big tributary. The Clark Fork is also considered a tributary, as is the Pack.

== Geology ==
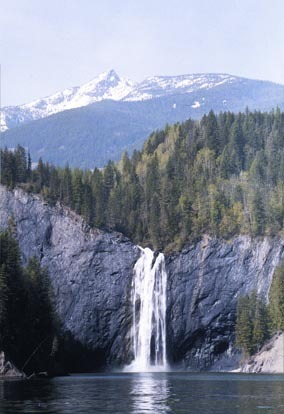
PeeWee Falls and the Pend Oreille River near Boundary Dam

Much of the Pend Oreille valley consists of relatively ancient metamorphic rock, uplifted over 500 million years ago from the former floor of the Precambrian sea that covered the region during that period. Granite batholiths overlain by layers of sedimentary rock compose most of the higher terrain, such as the Cabinet Mountains. The age of the rocks along the Pend Oreille generally decreases as one travels downstream (north), and the terrain is also more rugged towards the north than in the south. About 200 million years ago, increased tectonic activity caused the uplift of the Idaho Batholith, a portion of which cooled and eroded to become the present main body of the Bitterroot Range, a major physiographic feature of the watershed which sweeps from northwest to southeast along the entire Clark Fork valley (and the border of Idaho and Montana), by about 70 million years ago. This time period is generally accepted as when the entire Rocky Mountains system was formed, although age of the rocks varies with location.

In the previous Ice Age, a massive glacier of the Cordilleran Ice Sheet advanced southwards through the Idaho Panhandle, burying the Lake Pend Oreille and upper Pend Oreille River valley with ice hundreds to thousands of feet thick. This formed a pair of ice dams, one gigantic, and one significantly smaller. The one that caused the water of the Clark Fork and other smaller streams to back up into Glacial Lake Missoula, which stretched over two hundred miles southwest across western Montana, containing some 500 cubic miles (2,100 km^{3}) of water, was over 2,000 feet (610 m) high. The second one blocked the upper Pend Oreille River near Sandpoint, creating an enlarged Lake Pend Oreille that could have connected with a similarly enlarged Kootenay Lake in the north. Water pressure and glacial melt destroyed the larger of the two ice dams several times, causing massive amounts of water to rush out across eastern Washington through the upper Pend Oreille River. A mistaken belief is that these cataclysmic floods, known as the Missoula Floods, traveled down the Pend Oreille Valley into the Columbia. Rather, it is now thought that the water completely breached the western divide of the Pend Oreille River valley and rushed out towards the direction of Spokane.

== History ==
Native people who lived along the river included the Pend d'Oreilles and Kalispel (considered as a single tribe by the Bureau of Indian Affairs). Archaeological evidence suggests that people lived in the region as early as the end of the last ice age, about 11,000-12,000 years ago. The name Pend d'Oreille or Pend Oreille is variously stated to mean "earring", "hang from ears", or "shape of an ear". Kalispel is thought to mean "camas people", referring to the roots that provided their primary food. Both tribes lived around the area of Lake Pend Oreille occasionally ranging lower onto the Pend Oreille River (or maybe they did have settlements along the river?) but the lower (north) basin was generally less populated than the upper (south) portion. The Flathead tribe inhabited the upper (Clark Fork) part of the basin, especially the Bitterroot Valley. The Ktunaxa lived just to the east of the Pend Oreille river.

The first non-indigenous people to see the Pend Oreille were French-Canadian fur trappers working for various fur trading companies to provide beaver pelts to trade overseas. Some of these people were the ones to coin the term "Pend d'Oreille". Canadian explorer David Thompson saw the river in 1807, after a long and arduous journey from Saskatchewan. His primary mission was to find the source of the Columbia River (Columbia Lake), which he did. Afterwards he proceeded to establish trading posts throughout the region, including Kullyspell House on the north shore of Lake Pend Oreille. In 1808, Thompson again traveled into the Pend Oreille region. The following spring, he tried to reach the Columbia River by way of the Pend Oreille, but rapids and waterfalls hampered his attempt. He ended up retreating to another trading post in British Columbia a few months later. After these early explorations, however, there still were no permanent white settlements along the Pend Oreille River.

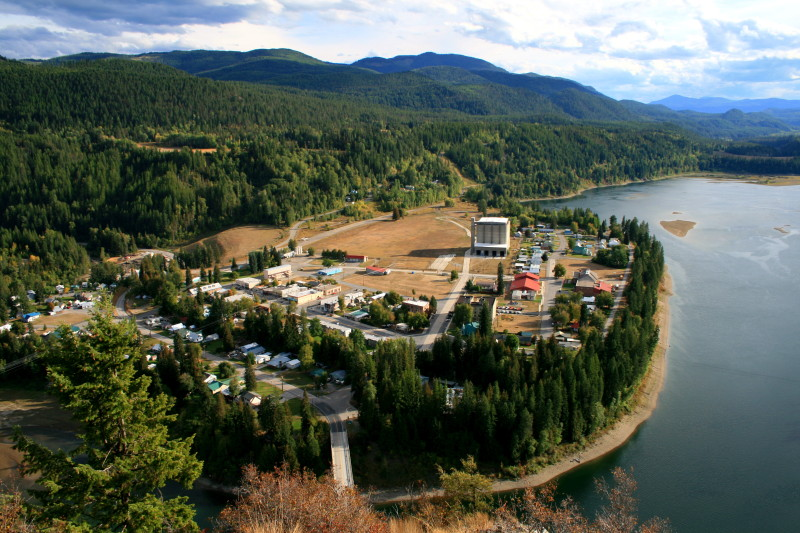
The Pend Oreille River at the town of Metaline Falls

By the 1840s, Europeans and Americans were pouring into the region in increasing numbers, although growth was slow. These newcomers did not strike good relations with the Native Americans of the area, and diseases such as smallpox wiped out many indigenous (this happened with many other tribes across North and Middle America as they were not used to such a sickness). After numerous wars and treaties, much of the land in the Pend Oreille basin especially the upper Clark Fork area had been ceded to the settlers. The last land in the Bitterroot area was given up in 1889, and many tribes of the Pend Oreille basin were moved to reservations in northwestern Montana. In the late 1850s, a major influx of non-indigenous peoples occurred when gold was discovered near Metaline Falls on the Pend Oreille River. The first major white settlements in that area, however, were not created until 1884. Mining for gold soon ceased but lead and zinc mining continued, reaching a peak in World War II when the metals were desperately needed for the productions of weapons, ships and planes.

In the 19th century, logging was the other major industry of the Pend Oreille River area and attracted hundreds to thousands of men to the region, many of them Scandinavian. Logging was profitable because almost the entire Pend Oreille watershed was forested with various types of trees. However, shipping logs to ports lower on the Columbia River (to the southwest of the Pend Oreille River) was a problem. Not only was the river riddled with frightening waterfalls and rapids, but it flows north, in the opposite direction that the logging companies wanted to move their logs. At about this time, steamboats were introduced to the Pend Oreille River. The first steamboat on the river was The Bertha, built in 1887 at Albeni Falls. Other well-known craft included Ione, Spokane, and Metaline (Pend Oreille). These boats carried passengers and ore and also towed log rafts up the river. (Since it flows north, they had to tow the logs south, against the current, to ship it a shorter distance to the lumber mills and factories lower in the Columbia Basin.) Navigation on the Pend Oreille presented few problems upstream of the Box Canyon rapids about three-fourths of the way down the Pend Oreille River (today close to the site of Box Canyon Dam). Many boats were wrecked in the stretch between Box Canyon and the river's mouth (including Metaline, which was the only large steamer to operate on the lower river on a regular basis). After the Idaho & Washington Northern Railroad was built in the area, steamboat commerce faded and the logs were transported by rail. The Idaho & Washington Northern was eventually succeeded by the Milwaukee Road.

The Pend Oreille River valley was never easy for early or later emigrants to settle in. The little arable land that did exist was mostly within the river's floodplain, and in many places there was only a narrow strip of flat ground that would soon run against vertical cliffs or dense forests with rocky soil. Nevertheless, some permanent settlements persisted, at Newport, Albeni Falls, Ione, Dalkena, Metaline Falls, Cusick, Usk, and many at the sites of the sawmills that cut the lumber extracted from the region. Some emigrants also settled along the Clark Fork, but there were similar problems because for most of its course, the Clark Fork, like the Pend Oreille, flows in a steep and narrow gorge. Larger numbers of people settled in the Flathead River valley, around Flathead Lake and Lake Pend Oreille, in the Priest River valley, and in the Bitterroot Valley of south-western Montana. Sandpoint (population 7,000), near where the river flows out of Lake Pend Oreille, remains the largest city in close proximity to the river.

== River modifications ==
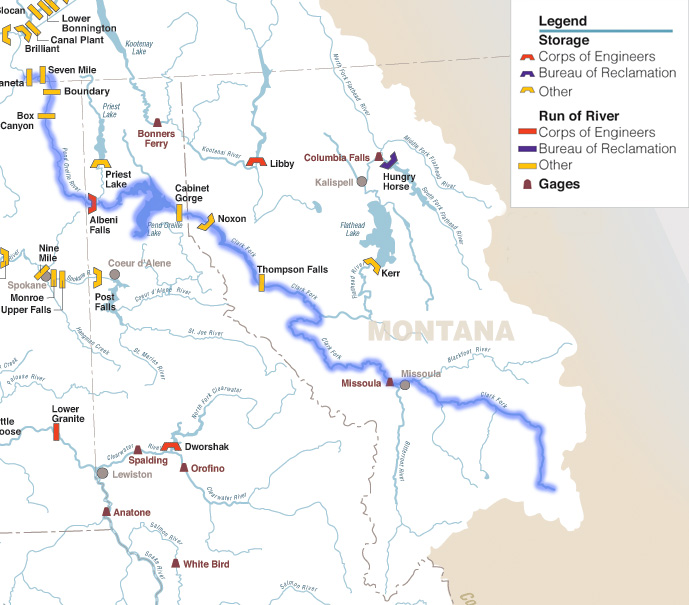
Map showing dams in the Pend Oreille River watershed (Clark Fork-Lake Pend Oreille-Pend Oreille system highlighted in blue)

There are five hydroelectric dams on the Pend Oreille River: Waneta (owned by Teck Cominco) and Seven Mile (B.C. Hydro) dams in Canada, Boundary (Seattle City Light), Box Canyon, (Pend Oreille County PUD), and Albeni Falls (U.S. Army Corps of Engineers) dams in the United States. The combined generating capacity of all the dams is approximately 2480 megawatts (MW). Boundary Dam has the largest generating capacity of the five, at 1070 MW. The smaller Albeni Falls Dam regulates the level of Lake Pend Oreille to provide some flood control during the summer and increased flows during dry winters. None of the dams provide for fish passage or navigation.

Numerous dams upstream along the Clark Fork (Cabinet Gorge, Noxon Rapids and Thompson Falls) and Flathead (SKQ/Flathead Lake and Hungry Horse) also generate power and to a lesser extent regulate the inflows to Lake Pend Oreille and the Pend Oreille River.

In the 1920s, there was a proposal to divert the Pend Oreille through a 60 miles (97 km) gravity canal to irrigate the Grand Coulee and surrounding lands in eastern Washington as part of the tentative Columbia Basin Project. These plans were later dropped with the construction of Grand Coulee Dam and a pumping plant on the Columbia River.

== Names ==
Variant names, according to the USGS, include: Bitter Root River, Bitterroot River, Clark Fork, Clarke Fork, Clarkes Fork, Clarks Fork, Deer Lodge River, Hell Gate River, Missoula River, Pend d'Oreille River, Silver Bow River, Clark's Fork, and Pend-d'Oreille River.

== Conservation ==
- The Lake Pend Oreille, Pend Oreille River, Priest Lake and Priest River Commission otherwise known as the “Lakes Commission” formed to oversee any issues relating to water quality and/or water quantity in Lake Pend Oreille, Pend Oreille River, Priest Lake and Priest River Basin.

As mitigation (mandated by the Federal Energy Regulatory Committee ‘FERC’) for the continued license/operation of the Boundary Dam on the Pend Oreille, Seattle City and Light had to provide mitigation funding. This mitigation funding came in the form of removing the 50 foot (15 m) high ‘Mill Pond Dam’ on Sullivan Creek just upstream of the town of Metaline Falls. Mill Pond Dam was removed in the summer of 2017 and the project finished in 2018 with stream and bank stabilization and native tree plantings. Sullivan Creek now runs free from its headwaters in the Salmon-Priest Wilderness to the Pend Oreille River. Native trout species will assuredly benefit by this habitat restoration.

== Recreation ==
The river is popular for boating and fishing.

The Pend Oreille River Trail covers 70 miles (110 km) from the Idaho/Washington border to Boundary Dam near the Canadian border. Maps can be found on the Pend Oreille County website. The river is popular for boating,

== See also ==
- List of tributaries of the Columbia River
- List of rivers of Washington (state)
- List of rivers of British Columbia
- List of rivers of Idaho
- List of longest streams of Idaho
