= Box Canyon Dam (Washington) =

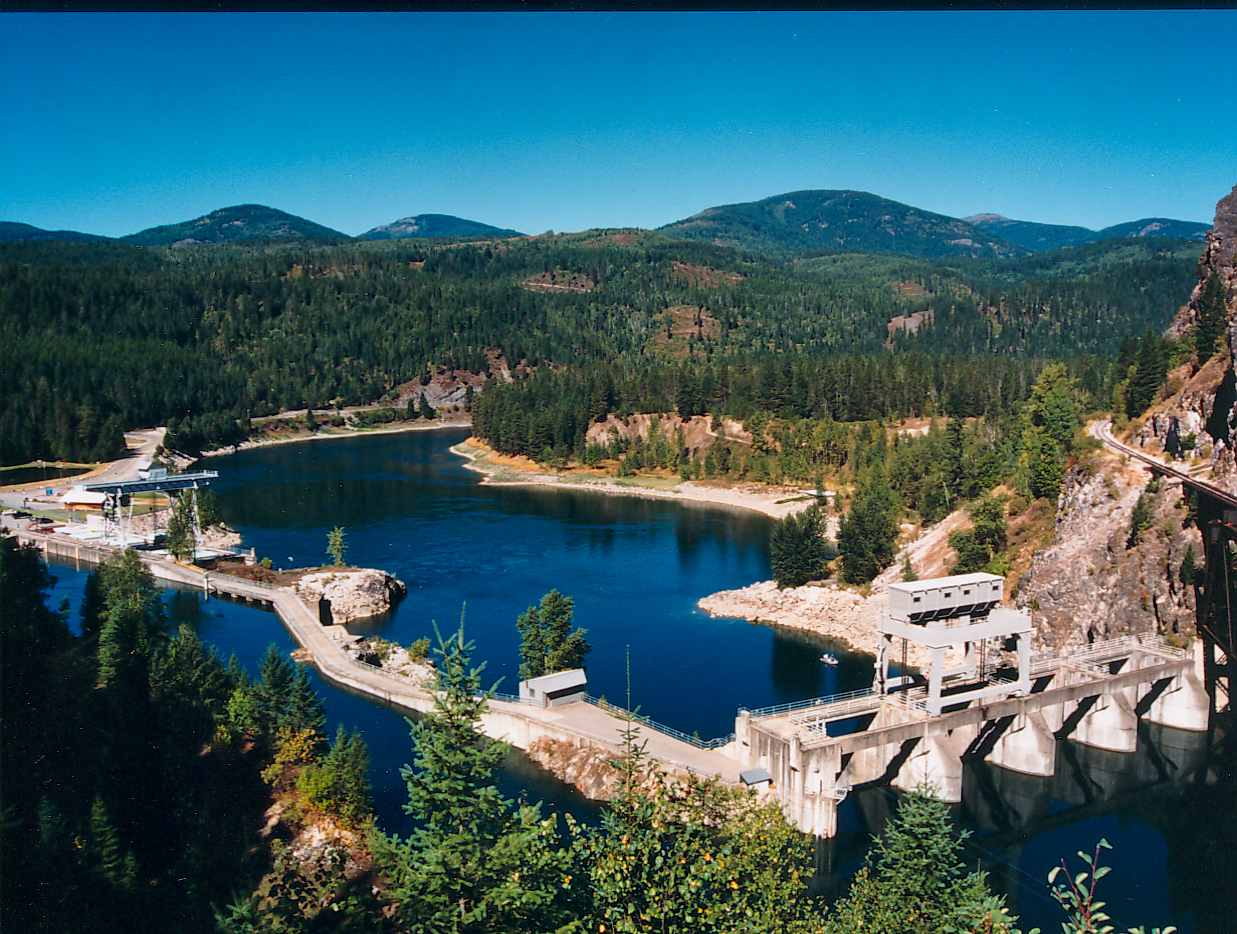
- Interactive map of Box Canyon Dam
- Location: Pend Oreille County, Washington
- Coordinates: 48°46′49″N 117°24′45″W
- Construction began: 1952
- Opening date: 1956
- Operator: Pend Oreille PUD

Dam and spillways
- Impounds: Pend Oreille River
- Height (foundation): 62 ft (19 m)
- Length: 160 ft (49 m)

Reservoir
- Creates: Box Canyon Reservoir
- Total capacity: 60,000 acre-feet (74,000,000 m^{3})
- Catchment area: 24,900 sq mi (64,490 km^{2})
- Surface area: 5 acres (20,000 m^{2})

Power Station
- Type: Conventional
- Turbines: 4x 22.5 MW
- Installed capacity: 90 MW
- Annual generation: 464.136 GWh(2024)

Box Canyon Dam is a gravity-type hydroelectric dam on the Pend Oreille River, in northeastern Washington state in the United States.

== Hydroelectric power capacity ==
It has a capacity of 90 MW and an average expected production of 60 MW. The reservoir extends 55 miles (89 km). The dam is 160 feet (49 m) wide and 62.4 feet (19.0 m) high at the top of the gates. The maximum head of water is 46 feet (14 m). It produces power using four Kaplan turbines. An upgrade completed in 2015 brought the dam's rated capacity up to 90 MW from the original 69 MW.

Generator	Nameplate Capacity (MW)
1	22.5
2	22.5
3	22.5
4	22.5
Total	90.0

== See also ==
- List of dams in the Columbia River watershed
