= Lake Pend Oreille =

Lake in Kootenai and Bonner counties in Idaho, United States

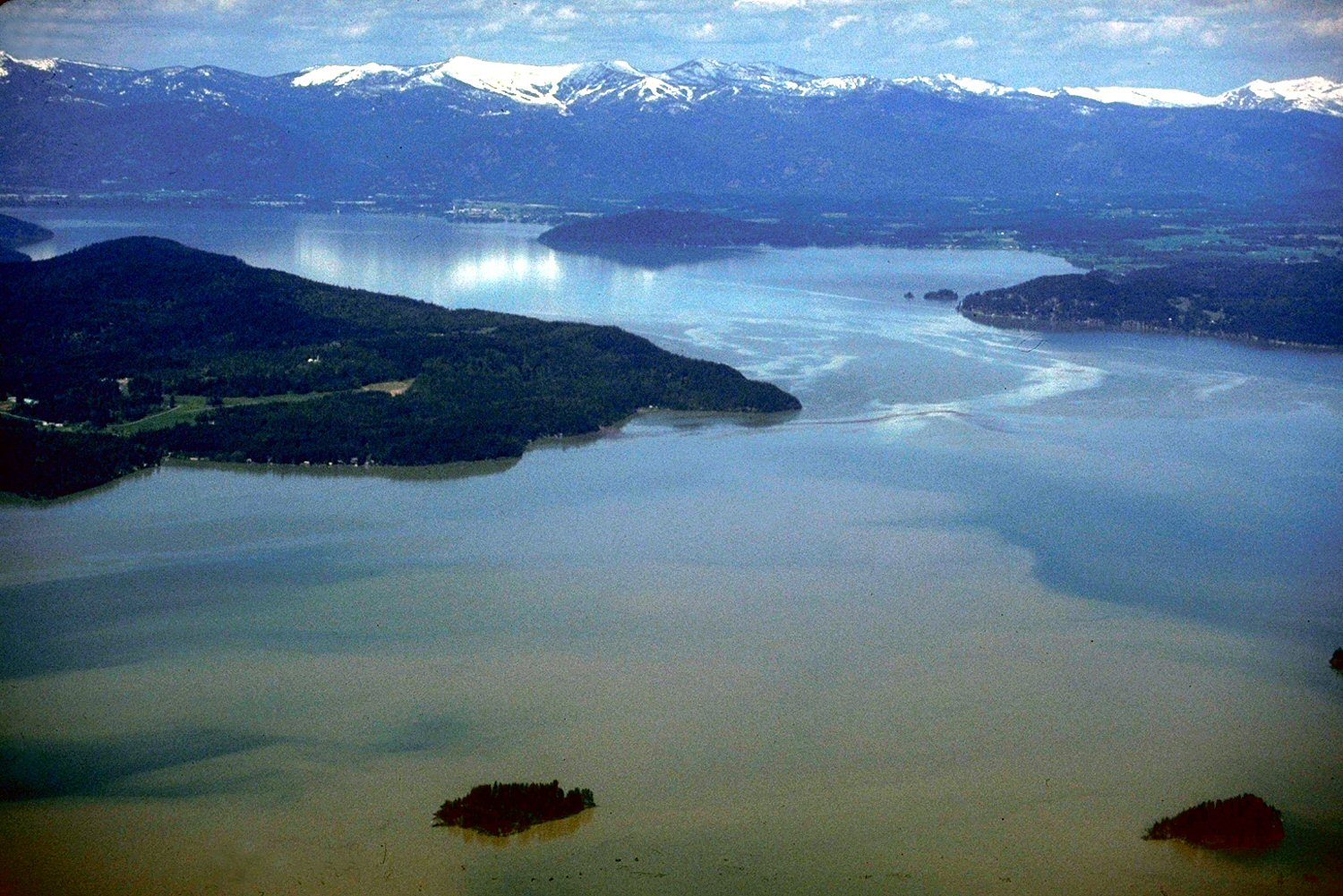
- Aerial view in 1993

- Location within Idaho Location within the United States
- Location: Bonner / Kootenai counties, Idaho, U.S.
- Coordinates: 48°10′0″N 116°20′0″W
- Primary inflows: Clark Fork River, Pack River, Trestle Creek
- Primary outflows: Pend Oreille River, Spokane Valley–Rathdrum Prairie Aquifer
- Basin countries: United States
- Max. length: 69 kilometres (43 mi)
- Surface area: 380 km^{2} (150 sq mi)
- Average depth: 142 m (466 ft)
- Max. depth: 351 m (1,152 ft)
- Water volume: 53.96 km^{3} (12.95 cu mi)
- Surface elevation: 628 metres (2,060 ft)
- Trenches: Purcell
- Settlements: Sandpoint, Bayview

Lake Pend Oreille (/ˌpɒndəˈreɪ/ POND-ə-RAY) in the northern Idaho Panhandle is the largest lake in the U.S. state of Idaho and the 40th-largest lake by area in the United States, with a surface area of 148 square miles (380 km^{2}). It is 69 kilometres (43 mi) long, and 1,152 feet (351 m) deep in some regions, making it the fifth-deepest in the nation and having a volume of 43,939,940 acre feet = 54 km^{3}. The lake is fed by the Clark Fork River and the Pack River, and drains into the Pend Oreille River, as well as subsurfacely into the Spokane Valley–Rathdrum Prairie Aquifer. It is surrounded by national forests and a few small towns, with the largest population on the lake at Sandpoint. The majority of the shoreline is non-populated and all but the southern tip of the lake is in Bonner County. The southern tip is in Kootenai County and is home to Farragut State Park, formerly the Farragut Naval Training Station during World War II, of which a small part is still active and conducts U.S. Navy acoustic underwater submarine research.

The surrounding forests consist of ponderosa pine, Douglas fir, red cedar, poplar, quaking aspen, hemlock, paper birch and western larch. Local animal species include white-tailed deer, elk, gray wolves, moose, mice, squirrels, chipmunks, black bears, grizzly bear, coyotes, mountain goat, cougar and bobcats, along with bald eagles, wild turkeys, osprey, owls, hummingbirds, hawks, woodpeckers, ducks, and the mountain bluebird. The lake is a home for several species of migratory water fowl.

== History ==
Lake Pend Oreille was glacially formed during the ice age. It is also believed that the eastern side of the lake was in the path of the ancient Missoula Floods. The lake sits at the south end of the Purcell Trench, carved by glaciers moving south from Canada. The eastern side of the glacier is believed to have formed the dam for the Missoula floods, at the point where the Clark Fork river enters the lake between the Cabinet and Bitterroot mountains. The lake is made slightly larger by the dam at Albeni Falls, just east of Oldtown; the dam is ninety feet (27 m) high and operated by the U.S. Army Corps of Engineers. Along with Crater Lake, Lake Tahoe, Lake Chelan, and Lake Superior, Lake Pend Oreille is among the five deepest lakes in the United States.

The area around the lake is the traditional home of the Kalispel Indian peoples. David Thompson established a North West Company trading post on the lake in 1809. A Canadian fur trader in Thompson's party is believed to have given the lake its name. The words "Pend Oreille" are French for an ear-hanging or pendant. Ear pendants were characteristic of the Kalispel tribe. The lake is shaped much like a human ear when viewed from above or on a map. In 1846, Great Britain ceded the bulk of its claims to the Pacific Northwest pursuant to the Oregon Treaty.

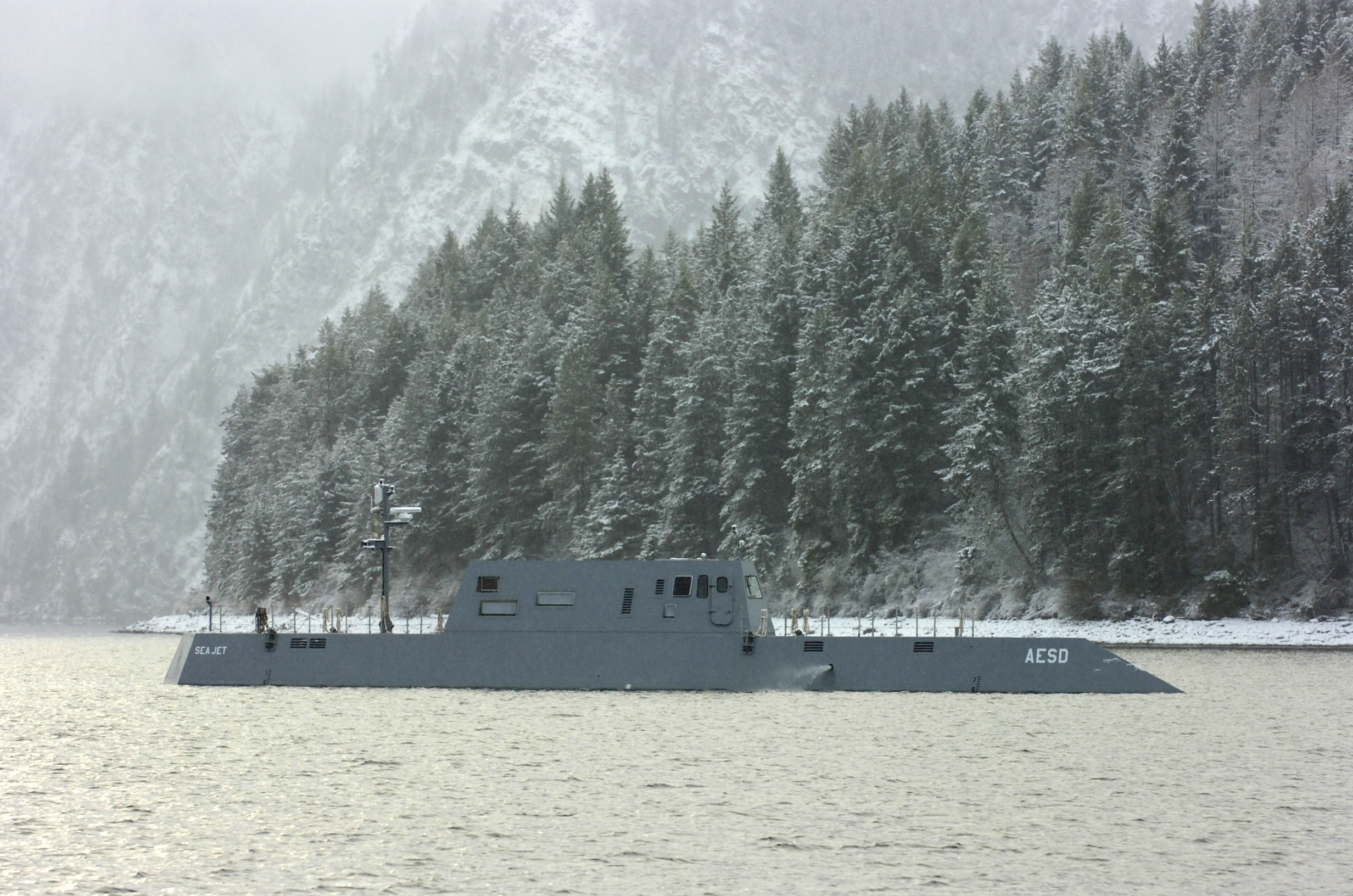
The Advanced Electric Ship Demonstrator (AESD) undergoes sea trials on Lake Pend Oreille at the Naval Surface Warfare Center

During World War II, the south end was the second largest naval training ground in the world and the largest "city" in the state. Built as a result of the Japanese attack on Pearl Harbor, the training station is now Farragut State Park. The lake's Large Scale Vehicle Range is still used by the Navy's Acoustic Research Detachment for sonar testing with large-scale submarine prototypes on the Pend Oreille Calibration Station. The significant depth gives acoustic properties similar to the open ocean. Background noise is less than at ocean testing locations, and the sound signatures being investigated cannot be monitored by foreign governments in international waters.

In 1967, the former Farragut Naval Training Station was used to accommodate the 12th World Scout Jamboree (August 1 to 8), the dates being significant as it marked 60 years to the date after Sir Robert Baden Powell held his first scout camp on Brownsea Island in Poole Harbour, Dorset in England.

== Other information ==
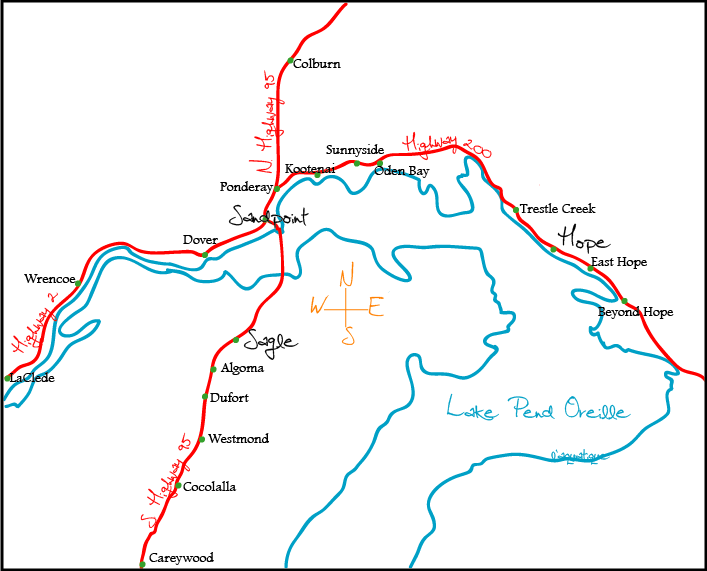
The highways and cities on the northern end of Lake Pend Oreille

The following towns are adjacent to the lake:

- Sandpoint
- Ponderay
- Kootenai
- Hope
- Clark Fork
- Bayview
- Sagle

The lake is viewed from the Pend Oreille Scenic Byway, State Highway 200 along the north shore. US 95 crosses the lake via Long bridge. Much of the shore is mountainous. The mountains to the east are the Green Monarchs; to the north are the Cabinet Mountains; to the southwest the Coeur d'Alene Mountains; and to northwest are the Selkirk Mountains.

== Aquatic invasive species ==
The lake is known to harbor several invasive species. Some of these species include:

- Eurasian watermilfoil
- Walleye (Also known as Yellow Pike)
- Lake Trout
- Northern Pike

== Fish ==
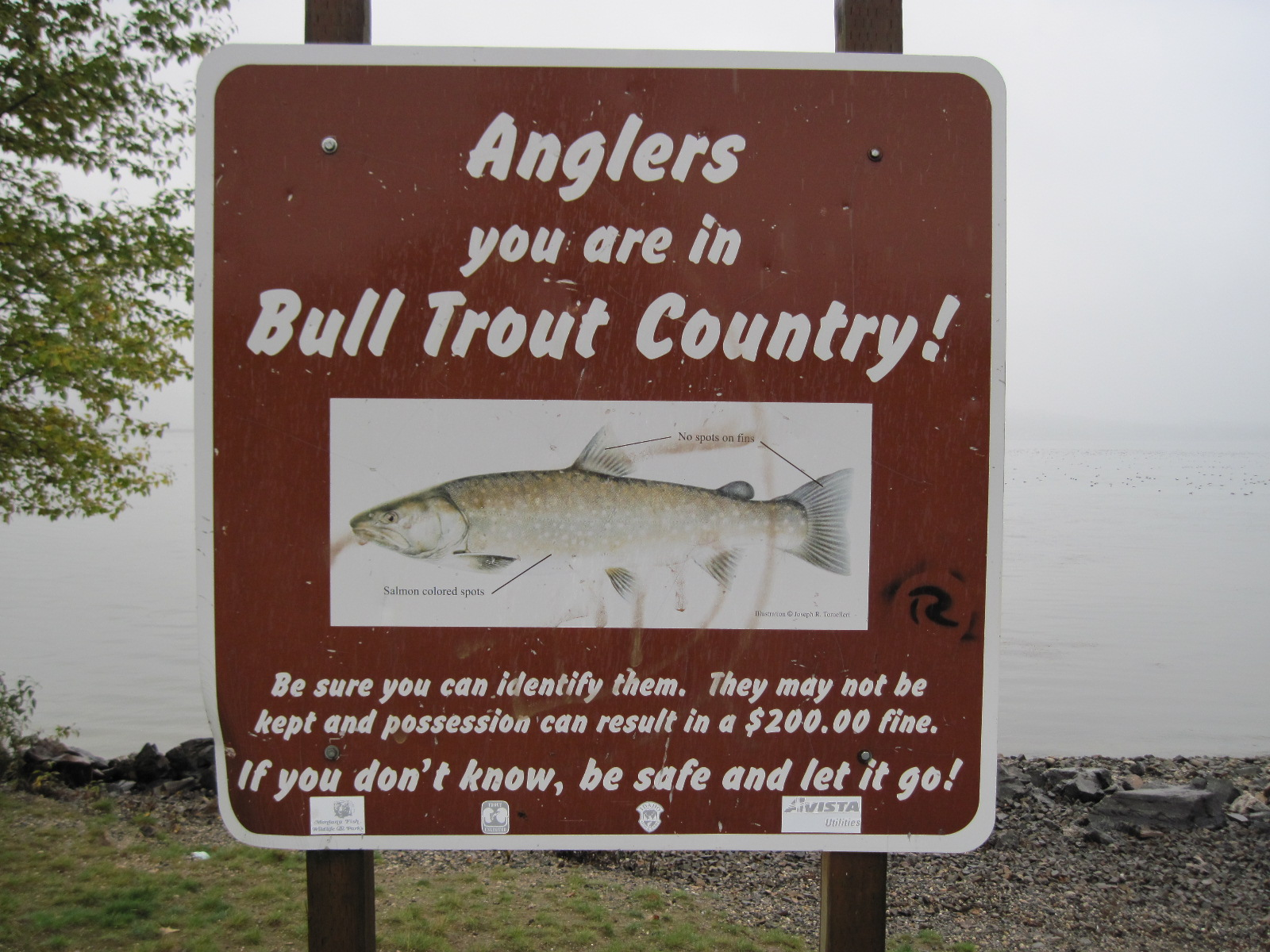
Sign in Sandpoint for anglers regarding protection of bull trout

The lake is home to many species of fish, including rainbow trout, lake trout, bull trout, cutthroat trout, brown trout, cutbow, perch, black crappie, bluegill, largemouth bass, smallmouth bass, whitefish, walleye, northern pikeminnow, and kokanee salmon. Lake Pend Oreille was also the home of the 37-pound (17-kilogram) state record gerrard rainbow trout (aka kamloops rainbow) caught by Wes Hamlet in 1947.

== See also ==
- Lake Coeur d'Alene
- Purcell Trench
