= Sage Dixon =

American politician (active 2014– )

Member of the Idaho House of Representatives
- In office December 1, 2014 – September 1, 2024 Serving with Mark Sauter
- Preceded by: George Eskridge
- Succeeded by: Cornel Rasor
- Constituency: 1st district Seat B (2014–2024)

Personal details
- Born: Wright-Patterson Air Force Base, Ohio, US
- Party: Republican
- Spouse: Veronica
- Children: 7
- Education: University of Akron
- Occupation: Politician, businessman

Sage Dixon is a former Republican Idaho State Representative, representing District 1 in the B seat from 2014 to 2024.

== Education and career ==
Dixon attended San Jose State University majoring in finance. He failed out of school. He was an owner of an electrical contracting business, and worked as a superintendent for an electrical contracting firm in Coeur d'Alene, Idaho.

== Elections ==
=== 2016 ===
After running unopposed in the Republican primary, Dixon defeated Democratic nominee Stephen Howlett with 68.60% of the vote.

Dixon supported Ted Cruz in the 2016 Republican Party presidential primaries.

=== 2014 ===
Scott defeated incumbent George Eskridge in the May 20, 2014 Republican Primary with 53.5% of the vote.

Scott defeated Andrew C. Sorg in the general election with 65.5% of the vote.
