= Shawn Keough =

American politician from Idaho

Shawn A. Keough

Idaho State Senator
- In office December 1, 1996 – November 30, 2018
- Preceded by: Tim Tucker
- Succeeded by: Jim Woodward
- Constituency: 1st District

Personal details
- Born: December 30, 1959 (age 66) Pompton Plains, New Jersey
- Party: Republican
- Spouse(s): Mike Keough; 2 children
- Education: Lewis Clark State College; North Idaho College
- Profession: Executive Director, Associated Logging Contractor
- Website: shawnkeough.com

Shawn A. Keough (born December 30, 1959) is an American politician, serving as a Republican member of the Idaho Senate from 1996 to 2018 representing the 1st district, and the longest-serving female Senator in Idaho's history.

== Early life, education, and career ==
Keough graduated from Walnut Hills High School in Cincinnati, Ohio, but has lived in Idaho since 1979, where she attended North Idaho College and Lewis Clark State College studying business management. She has been executive director for the Associated Logging Contractors since 2000. She has represented district 1 in the Idaho State Senate from 1996 to 2018. She was appointed to the Idaho State Board of Education in 2019. She is married to Mike Keough and is a mother of two who are in college.

== Idaho Senate ==
=== Committee assignments ===
- Finance Committee (chairman)
- Joint Finance-Appropriations Committee (co-chairman)
- Transportation Committee

== Elections ==
District 1 Senate - Boundary County and part of Bonner County
Year	Candidate	Votes	Pct	Candidate	Votes	Pct	Candidate	Votes	Pct
1996 primary	Shawn Keough	2,819	59.9%	Eugene Brown	1,884	40.1%			
1996 general	Shawn Keough	9,427	59.1%	Tim Tucker (incumbent)	6,513	40.9%			
1998 primary	Shawn Keough (incumbent)	3,163	100%						
1998 general	Shawn Keough (incumbent)	9,957	100%						
2000 primary	Shawn Keough (incumbent)	4,890	76.3%	Lisa Tanner	1,516	23.7%			
2000 general	Shawn Keough (incumbent)	11,413	73.4%	Steve Johnson	3,635	23.4%	Frank Reichert	496	3.2%
2002 primary	Shawn Keough (incumbent)	3,656	100%						
2002 general	Shawn Keough (incumbent)	7,904	71.6%	Gary Pietsch	3,133	28.4%			
2004 primary	Shawn Keough (incumbent)	4,116	100%						
2004 general	Shawn Keough (incumbent)	12,630	75.1%	Patty Douglas Palmer	4,177	24.9%			
2006 primary	Shawn Keough (incumbent)	3,866	100%						
2006 general	Shawn Keough (incumbent)	9,308	68.6%	Jim Ramsey	4,265	31.4%			
2008 primary	Shawn Keough (incumbent)	3,795	74.0%	Donald Heckel	1,334	26.0%			
2008 general	Shawn Keough (incumbent)	15,322	100%						
2010 primary	Shawn Keough (incumbent)	4,280	76.4%	Steve Tanner	1,325	23.6%			
2010 general	Shawn Keough (incumbent)	11,593	100%						
2012 primary	Shawn Keough (incumbent)	4,671	70.3%	Danielle Ahrens	1,976	29.7%			
2012 general	Shawn Keough (incumbent)	17,217	100%						
2014 primary	Shawn Keough (incumbent)	3,484	53.8%	Danielle Ahrens	2,997	46.2%			
2014 general	Shawn Keough (incumbent)	8,993	65.0%	Christian Fioravanti	4,834	35.0%			
2016 primary	Shawn Keough (incumbent)	4,141	55.7%	Glenn Rohrer	3,291	44.3%			
2016 general	Shawn Keough (incumbent)	17,264	76.3%	Steve Tanner	5,365	23.7%			

== See also ==
- List of Idaho Senators
- Idaho Senate
- Idaho's 1st legislative district
