= Heather Scott =

American politician and biologist from Idaho

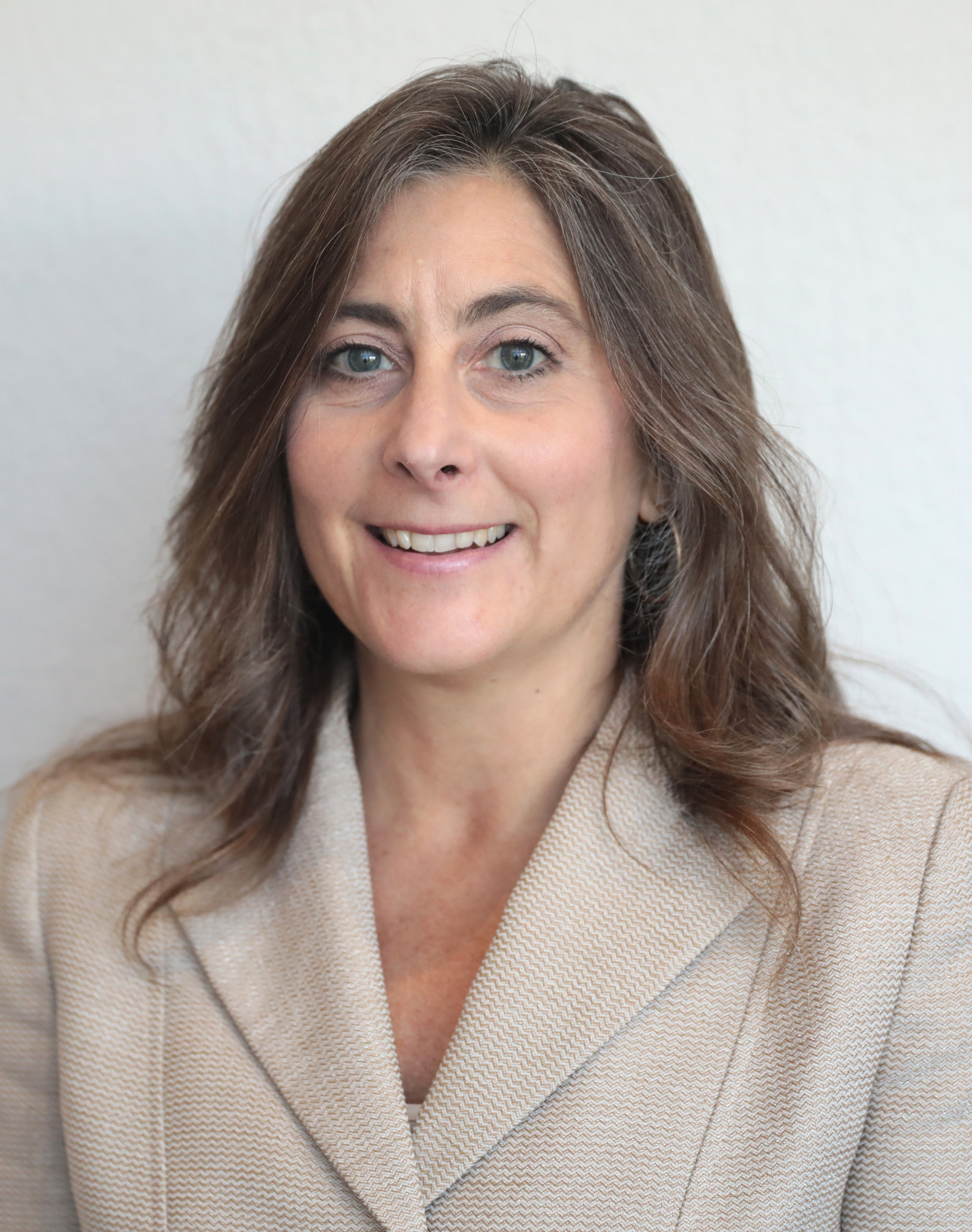

Member of the Idaho House of Representatives
- Incumbent
- Assumed office December 1, 2014 Serving with Dale Hawkins
- Preceded by: Eric Anderson
- Constituency: 1st district Seat A (2014–2022); 2nd district Seat A (2022–present)

Personal details
- Born: Ohio, U.S.
- Party: Republican
- Spouse: Andrew
- Education: University of Akron (BS)
- Website: Official website

Heather Scott is an American biologist, businesswoman, and politician serving as a Republican member of the Idaho House of Representatives from the 1st district. She has been a member of the Idaho House since 2014. She is the Co-Chair of the Idaho Freedom Caucus.

== Early life and education ==
Born in Ohio, Scott earned a Bachelor of Science degree in biology from the University of Akron.

== Career ==
She was employed in the field of fisheries and aquatic biology for over 15 years related to the Federal Energy Regulatory Commission re-licensing and operations of hydroelectric facilities.

=== Idaho House of Representatives ===
In 2015 Scott is reported to have cut wires which were part of the fire-suppression system in her office. Scott believed at the time that the smoke detector was actually a listening device planted to spy on her. The wire-cutting incident was witnessed by other Idaho House members.

In August 2017, Scott defended white nationalism on her Facebook page, writing: "The way the media has set this up, the mention of white nationalist, which is no more than a Caucasian who (sic) for the Constitution and making America great again, and confusing it with term, 'white supremacist' which is extreme racism. Therefore, if one is 'guilty' of being white, one is clearly racist."

At the start of the 2017 legislative session, Scott reportedly made a remark to fellow state representative Judy Boyle, upon learning of her appointment to the state legislature's agriculture committee. The reported comment was that female lawmakers obtain ranking committee appointments and other leadership positions only if they "spread their legs." The alleged comment received widespread rebuke from other state lawmakers.

In the 2019 legislative session, Scott sponsored a bill that would have required Idaho's Child Protective Services to mirandize parents before assessing them or their children. After passing the House, the bill was held in committee in the Senate.

In 2019, it was reported that Scott was a member of the Coalition of Western States (COWS), a group founded by Washington state representative Matt Shea that has been accused of involvement in domestic terrorism.

In April 2020, she dismissed the severity of the COVID-19 pandemic, claiming the virus was trying to kill the U.S. Constitution and "The lying, Trump-hating media who continues to push global and socialist agendas has told us that there is an emergency."

In an April 2021 debate on the House floor, Scott claimed the book To Kill a Mockingbird was an example of critical race theory in schools.

In 2021, Scott sought a copy of the police report accusing fellow state Republican Aaron von Ehlinger of rape and asked the victim's legal representative how a person who files a false police report alleging sexual assault could be charged with a crime.

Scott spoke against a bill in 2023 that would have provided tampons and pads in girls' public school bathrooms in middle and high school, calling it a "very liberal policy" and asking "Why are our schools obsessed with the private parts of our children?" The bill failed.

In 2025, Scott proposed sending a statement to the Supreme Court of the United States to reverse its decision in Obergefell v. Hodges (2015) and allow Idaho to prohibit same-sex marriage again, calling the ruling an "illegitimate overreach" and asking for the restoration of "the natural definition of marriage" (between men and women only). The Idaho House of Representatives passed this resolution on January 27, 2025.

=== Elections ===
In 2014, Scott defeated Stephen T. Snedden in the Republican primary, winning with 63.8% of the vote. She defeated Laura Bry in the general election with 66.1% of the vote.

In 2016, Scott ran unopposed in the Republican primary. She defeated Kate McAlister with 62.54% of the vote. She supported Ted Cruz in the Republican Party presidential primaries, 2016.

In 2018, Scott defeated Mike Boeck in the Republican primary. She supported Congressman Raul Labrador for governor in the May 2018 Republican primary.

In 2020, Scott ran unopposed in the Republican primary. She defeated Gail Bolin in the general election with 68.0 percent of the vote.

In 2024, Scott ran unopposed in the Republican primary. Democrat Loree Peery ran against Scott in the general election getting 18.9% of the vote. Peery decided to run after Scott introduced a bill expanding an anti-cannibalism law in response to a prank video.
