= Albeni Falls Dam =

Dam in the state of Idaho

Albeni Dam
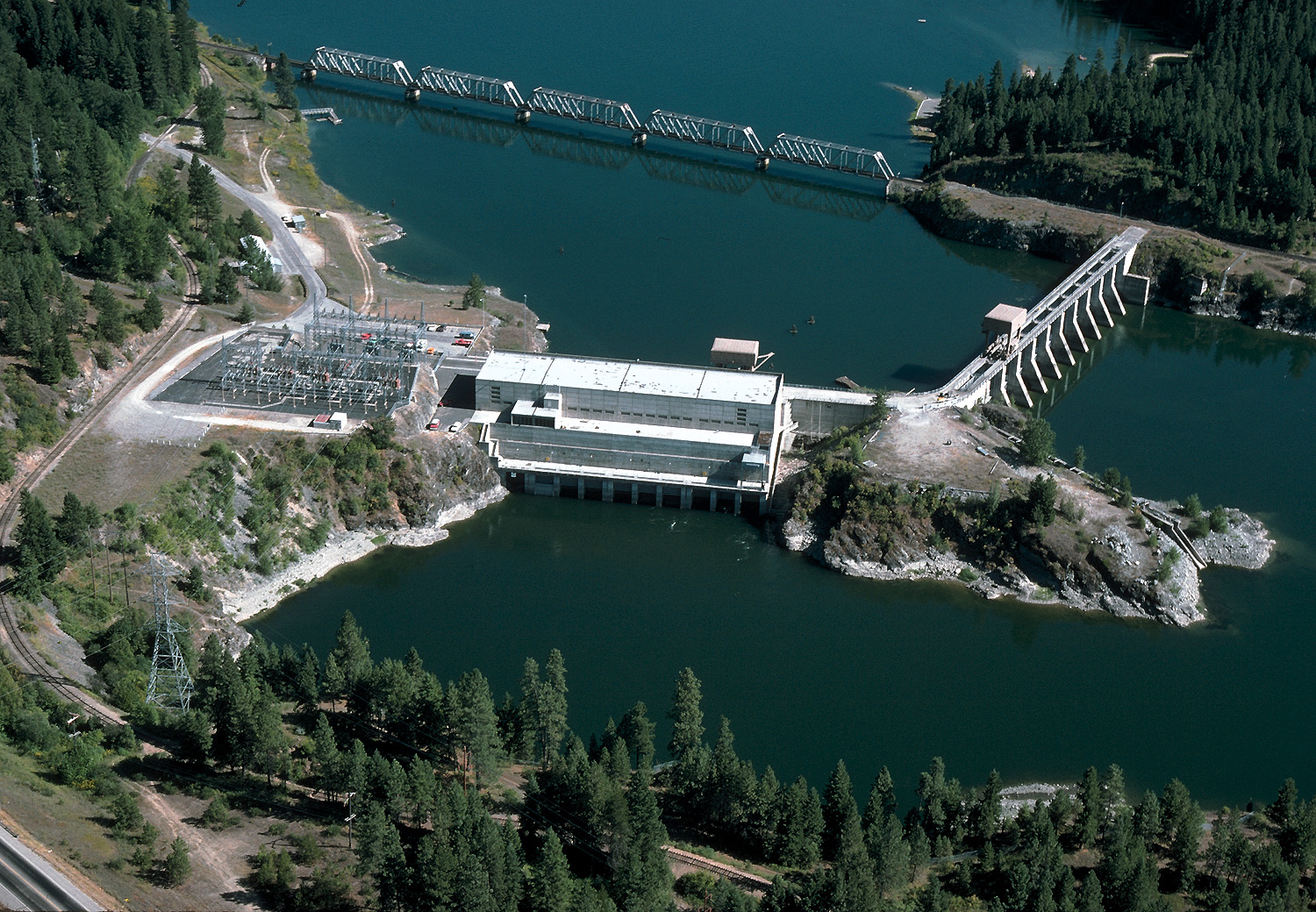
- Aerial view of the reservoir and dam
- Location: Bonner County, Idaho
- Coordinates: 48°10′48″N 116°59′59″W
- Construction began: 1951
- Opening date: 1955
- Construction cost: $34 million
- Operator(s): United States Army Corps of Engineers

Dam and spillways
- Impounds: Pend Oreille
- Height: 90 ft (27 m)

Reservoir
- Creates: Raises Lake Pend Oreille

Power Station
- Operator(s): U.S. Army Corps of Engineers
- Installed capacity: 42 MW
- Annual generation: 200,000,000 kWh

Albeni Falls Dam is located on the Pend Oreille River between Oldtown, Idaho, and Priest River, Idaho. It is located on the site of a natural waterfall named Albeni Falls, named after early pioneer Albeni Poirier.

Construction on the dam began in 1951 and was completed in 1955 at a cost of $34 million ($261 million in 2007 dollars). It produces over 200 million kilowatt hours of electricity each year for the Bonneville Power Administration and is operated by the U.S. Army Corps of Engineers.

The dam is 90 feet (27 m) high and 775 feet (236 m) long. Its spillway is 400 feet (120 m) long.

== See also ==
- List of dams in the Columbia River watershed
