= East Hope, Idaho =

- City
- Location of East Hope in Bonner County, Idaho.
- Coordinates: 48°14′27″N 116°17′25″W
- Country: United States
- State: Idaho
- County: Bonner

Area
  - Total: 0.42 sq mi (1.10 km^{2})
  - Land: 0.42 sq mi (1.08 km^{2})
  - Water: 0.012 sq mi (0.03 km^{2})
- Elevation: 2,218 ft (676 m)

Population (2020)
  - Total: 229
  - Density: 549/sq mi (212/km^{2})
- Time zone: UTC-8 (Pacific (PST))
  - Summer (DST): UTC-7 (PDT)
- ZIP code: 83836
- Area codes: 208, 986
- FIPS code: 16-23680
- GNIS feature ID: 2410387
- Website: www.cityofeasthope.com

East Hope is a city in Bonner County, Idaho, United States. The population was 229 at the 2020 census.

== Geography ==
According to the United States Census Bureau, the city has a total area of 0.46 square miles (1.19 km^{2}), of which, 0.40 square miles (1.04 km^{2}) is land and 0.06 square miles (0.16 km^{2}) is water.

== Demographics ==
Historical population
| Census | Pop. | Note | %± |
|---|---|---|---|
| 1920 | 223 | | — |
| 1930 | 115 | | −48.4% |
| 1940 | 115 | | 0.0% |
| 1950 | 149 | | 29.6% |
| 1960 | 154 | | 3.4% |
| 1970 | 175 | | 13.6% |
| 1980 | 258 | | 47.4% |
| 1990 | 215 | | −16.7% |
| 2000 | 200 | | −7.0% |
| 2010 | 210 | | 5.0% |
| 2020 | 229 | | 9.0% |
U.S. Decennial Census

=== 2010 census ===
At the 2010 census, there were 210 people, 109 households and 64 families living in the city. The population density was 525.0 per square mile (202.7/km^{2}). There were 181 housing units at an average density of 452.5 per square mile (174.7/km^{2}). The racial makeup was 98.1% White, 0.5% Native American, 0.5% Asian, 0.5% Pacific Islander, and 0.5% from other races. Hispanic or Latino of any race were 2.4% of the population.

There were 109 households, of which 13.8% had children under the age of 18 living with them, 55.0% were married couples living together, 3.7% had a female householder with no husband present, and 41.3% were non-families. 34.9% of all households were made up of individuals, and 21.1% had someone living alone who was 65 years of age or older. The average household size was 1.93 and the average family size was 2.42.

The median age was 58.5 years. 12.4% of residents were under the age of 18; 1.8% were between the ages of 18 and 24; 16.2% were from 25 to 44; 39.6% were from 45 to 64; and 30% were 65 years of age or older. The gender makeup was 48.1% male and 51.9% female.

=== 2000 census ===
At the 2000 census, there were 200 people, 104 households and 68 families living in the city. The population density was 364.2 inhabitants per square mile (140.6/km^{2}). There were 150 housing units at an average density of 273.1 per square mile (105.4/km^{2}). The racial makeup of the city was 98.50% White, 0.50% Native American, 0.50% Asian, and 0.50% from two or more races. Hispanic or Latino of any race were 0.50% of the population.

There were 104 households, of which 9.6% had children under the age of 18 living with them, 63.5% were married couples living together, 2.9% had a female householder with no husband present, and 33.7% were non-families. 29.8% of all households were made up of individuals, and 11.5% had someone living alone who was 65 years of age or older. The average household size was 1.92 and the average family size was 2.33.

10.5% of the population were under the age of 18, 2.5% from 18 to 24, 14.0% from 25 to 44, 31.0% from 45 to 64, and 42.0% who were 65 years of age or older. The median age was 58 years. For every 100 females, there were 112.8 males. For every 100 females age 18 and over, there were 105.7 males.

The median household income was $30,417 and the median family income was $37,500. Males had a median income of $35,938 and females $21,667. The per capita income was $18,184. About 3.2% of families and 7.1% of the population were below the poverty line, including none of those under the age of eighteen and 12.3% of those 65 or over.

== See also ==
- List of cities in Idaho
