= Ponderay, Idaho =

- City
- Location of Ponderay in Bonner County, Idaho.
- Coordinates: 48°18′33″N 116°32′21″W
- Country: United States
- State: Idaho
- County: Bonner
- Incorporated (village): May 27, 1947
- Incorporated (city): November 26, 1968

Area
  - Total: 3.45 sq mi (8.94 km^{2})
  - Land: 2.93 sq mi (7.60 km^{2})
  - Water: 0.52 sq mi (1.34 km^{2})
- Elevation: 2,129 ft (649 m)

Population (2020)
  - Total: 1,289
  - Density: 439.3/sq mi (169.6/km^{2})
- Time zone: UTC-8 (Pacific (PST))
  - Summer (DST): UTC-7 (PDT)
- ZIP code: 83852
- Area code: 208
- FIPS code: 16-64450
- GNIS feature ID: 2411457
- Website: www.cityofponderay.org

Ponderay (/ˌpɒndəˈreɪ/ POND-ə-RAY) is a city in Bonner County, Idaho. As of the 2020 census, Ponderay had a population of 1,289. Ponderay's city motto is "Little City with the Big Future". Its name is an English phonetic spelling of the French words “Pend d'Oreille”, the name of a local indigenous people that live in the region. The name of the lake the city sits on, Lake Pend Oreille, is also a corruption of the Pend d'Orielles.

== History ==
Ponderay's original plat was filed in Kootenai County on May 5, 1904. It was incorporated as the Village of Ponderay on May 27, 1947, and became the City of Ponderay on November 26, 1968. Ponderay was built on the site of the company town of the Panhandle Smelting and Refining Company.

== Geography ==
According to the United States Census Bureau, the city has a total area of 3.02 square miles (7.82 km^{2}), of which, 2.90 square miles (7.51 km^{2}) is land and 0.12 square miles (0.31 km^{2}) is water.

== Demographics ==
Historical population
Census	Pop.	Note	%±
1950	248		—
1960	231		−6.9%
1970	275		19.0%
1980	399		45.1%
1990	449		12.5%
2000	638		42.1%
2010	1,137		78.2%
2020	1,289		13.4%
U.S. Decennial Census

=== 2020 census ===
As of the 2020 census, Ponderay had a population of 1,289. The median age was 38.7 years. 20.2% of residents were under the age of 18 and 20.6% of residents were 65 years of age or older. For every 100 females there were 102.0 males, and for every 100 females age 18 and over there were 102.0 males age 18 and over.

74.6% of residents lived in urban areas, while 25.4% lived in rural areas.

There were 608 households in Ponderay, of which 21.9% had children under the age of 18 living in them. Of all households, 28.1% were married-couple households, 31.7% were households with a male householder and no spouse or partner present, and 34.2% were households with a female householder and no spouse or partner present. About 41.3% of all households were made up of individuals and 22.0% had someone living alone who was 65 years of age or older.

There were 660 housing units, of which 7.9% were vacant. The homeowner vacancy rate was 1.7% and the rental vacancy rate was 4.1%.

Racial composition as of the 2020 census
Race	Number	Percent
White	1,187	92.1%
Black or African American	1	0.1%
American Indian and Alaska Native	4	0.3%
Asian	11	0.9%
Native Hawaiian and Other Pacific Islander	1	0.1%
Some other race	15	1.2%
Two or more races	70	5.4%
Hispanic or Latino (of any race)	54	4.2%

=== 2010 census ===
At the 2010 census there were 1,137 people in 521 households, including 277 families, in the city. The population density was 392.1 inhabitants per square mile (151.4/km^{2}). There were 622 housing units at an average density of 214.5 per square mile (82.8/km^{2}). The racial makeup of the city was 94.5% White, 0.3% African American, 0.7% Native American, 0.1% Asian, 0.9% from other races, and 3.5% from two or more races. Hispanic or Latino of any race were 4.2%.

Of the 521 households 29.0% had children under the age of 18 living with them, 34.7% were married couples living together, 12.7% had a female householder with no husband present, 5.8% had a male householder with no wife present, and 46.8% were non-families. 38.2% of households were one person and 10.3% were one person aged 65 or older. The average household size was 2.17 and the average family size was 2.86.

The median age was 34 years. 23.5% of residents were under the age of 18; 11.7% were between the ages of 18 and 24; 26.3% were from 25 to 44; 27% were from 45 to 64; and 11.5% were 65 or older. The gender makeup of the city was 46.9% male and 53.1% female.

=== 2000 census ===
At the 2000 census there were 638 people in 264 households, including 168 families, in the city. The population density was 237.9 inhabitants per square mile (91.9/km^{2}). There were 296 housing units at an average density of 110.4 per square mile (42.6/km^{2}). The racial makeup of the city was 97.02% White, 0.47% African American, 0.63% Native American, 1.10% Asian, 0.31% from other races, and 0.47% from two or more races. Hispanic or Latino of any race were 0.31%.

Of the 264 households 29.2% had children under the age of 18 living with them, 50.0% were married couples living together, 6.8% had a female householder with no husband present, and 36.0% were non-families. 26.1% of households were one person and 8.0% were one person aged 65 or older. The average household size was 2.38 and the average family size was 2.88.

The age distribution was 25.7% under the age of 18, 8.3% from 18 to 24, 27.4% from 25 to 44, 27.0% from 45 to 64, and 11.6% 65 or older. The median age was 37 years. For every 100 females, there were 117.7 males. For every 100 females age 18 and over, there were 106.1 males.

The median household income was $27,853 and the median family income was $30,227. Males had a median income of $26,875 versus $15,917 for females. The per capita income for the city was $13,432. About 13.2% of families and 15.7% of the population were below the poverty line, including 20.9% of those under age 18 and none of those age 65 or over.
