= Federal buildings in the United States =

Office buildings for U.S. government tenants

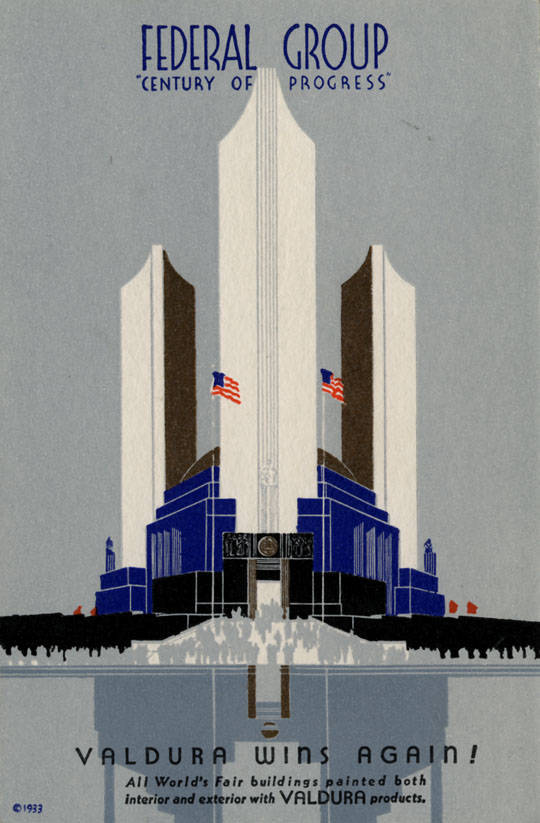
The so-called Federal Building was one of the exhibit halls at the 1933 Chicago World’s Fair

Federal buildings in the United States house offices of the United States government that provide services to state and city level population centers. These federal buildings are often literally named "Federal Building", with this moniker displayed on the property. They may share real estate with federal courthouses.

Federal buildings around the country have frequently been the site of protests, generally for issues in which the Federal government is understood to play a key role, and especially for anti-war demonstrations.

There are design issues specific to federal buildings, relating to their multipurpose functions and concerns related to the fact of their association with the government. For example, as symbols of the government, they may potentially be the focus of protests or threats, so there are security issues. Also environmental impacts and environmentally sound design may be more important.

A committee set up by President John F. Kennedy in 1962 issued "Guiding Principles for Federal Architecture". Towards improving design of federal buildings in the United States, "the committee recommended architecture that would convey the 'dignity, enterprise, vigor, and stability of the American Government.' Designers and officials were encouraged to pay special attention to site selection and layout, including landscape development."

Some architects specialize in federal building designs.

== History ==
The first U.S. Federal building authorized by the U.S. Congress in 1807, with an appropriation of $20,000 to build, in New Orleans, a post office, courthouse, or custom house.

Historically, the authorization and construction of the first federally-funded building in a small town often has been a major event. Sometimes these were simply a post office or a courthouse; often they were combination buildings.

The Treasury Department of the U.S. established a Department of Construction office in 1852. From 1864 on the Office of the Supervising Architect handled design of federal buildings.

William Gibbs McAdoo, the Secretary of the Treasury from 1913 to 1918, and the Supervising Architect at the time, James A. Wetmore promoted standardization of government building design. They instituted the policy that buildings were to be designed with "scale, materials and finishes" that directly reflected their "location, prominence and income". This push to standardization of public building design was in conflict with the Tarsney Act, which permitted private architects to design federal buildings after being selected in a competition under the supervision of the Supervising Architect. The act, under which several prior buildings were designed, was repealed in 1913 as it was felt that designing building with government architects would most efficiently cause the desired standardization.

Buildings were to be designed with specific criteria, A "Class A" building was one which was on a major street of a major city, surrounding by expensive building and expected to generate at least $800,000 in revenue. These buildings would have marble or granite exteriors, marble interiors, ornamental bronze, and other similar fixtures.

A small post office with revenue of under $15,000 would be made of brick, with standard wood windows and doors and would appear "ordinary". Critics felt the system would make public buildings too plain.

The growth of cities and government functions has led to the need for large multipurpose highrise federal buildings. An example is the 32-story $120 million construction in Cleveland of the Anthony J. Celebrezze Federal Building.

In the United States, multipurpose federal buildings are generally managed by the U.S. General Services Administration. The GSA recognized its top 20 federal buildings in 2014.

== List of federal buildings in the United States ==
Notable buildings in the United States that have been termed "federal building" include:

=== Alabama ===
- Federal Building and U.S. Courthouse (Dothan, Alabama), listed on the National Register of Historic Places (NRHP)

=== Alaska ===
- Federal Building (Fairbanks, Alaska), NRHP-listed in Fairbanks North Star Borough
- Hurff Ackerman Saunders Federal Building and Robert Boochever US Courthouse, Juneau, Alaska
- Ketchikan Federal Building, Ketchikan, Alaska, NRHP-listed
- Old Federal Building (Anchorage, Alaska), NRHP-listed

=== Arkansas ===
- Federal Building (Little Rock, Arkansas) (1961)

=== California ===
- 300 North Los Angeles Street Federal Building, Los Angeles
- 50 United Nations Plaza Federal Office Building, San Francisco
- Edward J. Schwartz Federal Building and United States Courthouse, San Diego
- Edward R. Roybal Federal Building and United States Courthouse, Los Angeles
- Glenn M. Anderson Federal Building, Long Beach
- James C. Corman Federal Building, Los Angeles
- John E. Moss Federal Building, Sacramento
- John F. Shea Federal Building, Santa Rosa
- Leo J. Ryan Federal Building, San Bruno
- Main Post Office and Federal Building, NRHP-listed, Oakland
- Phillip Burton Federal Building and United States Courthouse, San Francisco
- Robert E. Coyle Federal Building and United States Courthouse, Fresno
- Robert F. Peckham Federal Building and United States Courthouse, San Jose
- Robert T. Matsui Federal Building and United States Courthouse, Sacramento
- Ronald V. Dellums Federal Building and United States Courthouse, Oakland
- Ronald Reagan Federal Building and United States Courthouse, Santa Ana
- Sacramento Federal Building – Cottage Way, Sacramento
- Sacramento Federal Building – Downtown, Sacramento
- Santa Ana Federal Building, Santa Ana
- Speaker Nancy Pelosi Federal Building, San Francisco
- U.S. Post Office, Courthouse and Federal Building, NRHP-listed, Sacramento
- U.S. Post Office, also known as the Federal Building, Stockton
- Wilshire Federal Building, Los Angeles

=== Colorado ===
- Byron White United States Courthouse, Denver, Colorado, formerly known and NRHP-listed as "U.S. Post Office and Federal Building"
- Federal Building (Colorado Springs, Colorado), a former Ent Air Force Base computer facility
- Pueblo Federal Building, Pueblo, Colorado, NRHP-listed
- United States Post Office and Federal Courthouse-Colorado Springs Main, NRHP-listed
- US Post Office and Federal Building-Canon City Main, Canon City, Colorado, NRHP-listed in Fremont County
- US Post Office and Federal Building-Delta Main, Delta, Colorado, NRHP-listed in Delta County
- US Post Office and Federal Building-Monte Vista Main, Monte Vista, Colorado, NRHP-listed in Rio Grande County
- US Post Office, Federal Building, and Federal Courthouse-Sterling Main, Sterling, Colorado, NRHP-listed in Logan County

=== Connecticut ===
- William R. Cotter Federal Building, Hartford, Connecticut, NRHP-listed

=== Florida ===
- U.S. Post Office-Federal Building (Sarasota, Florida), NRHP-listed
- U.S. Courthouse Building and Downtown Postal Station (Tampa, Florida), also known and NRHP-listed as "Federal Building, U.S. Courthouse, Downtown Postal Station"

=== Georgia ===
- Federal Building and Courthouse (Gainesville, Georgia), NRHP-listed
- Old U.S. Post Office and Federal Building (Macon, Georgia), NRHP-listed
- Tomochichi Federal Building and United States Courthouse, Savannah, Georgia, NRHP-listed

=== Hawaii ===
- Prince Kūhiō Federal Building, Honolulu, Hawaii

=== Idaho ===
- Coeur d'Alene Federal Building, Coeur d'Alene, Idaho, NRHP-listed in Kootenai County
- Pocatello Federal Building, Pocatello, Idaho, NRHP-listed in Bannock County
- Sandpoint Federal Building, Sandpoint, Idaho, NRHP-listed in Bonner County

=== Illinois ===
- Chicago Federal Building, Chicago, Illinois
- Everett M. Dirksen U.S. Courthouse, also known as "Dirksen Federal Building" or the "Chicago Federal Center", Chicago, Illinois
- Kluczynski Federal Building, Chicago, Illinois
- Pekin Federal Building, Pekin, Illinois, NRHP-listed

=== Indiana ===
- Birch Bayh Federal Building and United States Courthouse, a courthouse of the United States District Court for the Southern District of Indiana, also known as Federal Building
- Minton-Capehart Federal Building, Indianapolis, Indiana
- Terre Haute Post Office and Federal Building, Terre Haute, Indiana, NRHP-listed

=== Iowa ===
- Federal Building and United States Courthouse (Sioux City, Iowa), NRHP-listed

=== Kansas ===
- Federal Building-US Post Office (Independence, Kansas), NRHP-listed in Montgomery County
- US Post Office and Federal Building-Salina, Salina, Kansas, NRHP-listed in Saline County
- United States Post Office and Federal Building (Wichita, Kansas), NRHP-listed

=== Kentucky ===
- Federal Building-Courthouse (London, Kentucky), NRHP-listed
- Federal Building and US Post Office-Owensboro, Owensboro, Kentucky, NRHP-listed in Daviess County

=== Louisiana ===
- Federal Building (Ruston, Louisiana), NRHP-listed in Lincoln Parish
- Old Federal Building (Opelousas, Louisiana), NRHP-listed in St. Landry Parish

=== Michigan ===
- Federal Building (Lansing, Michigan), NRHP-listed in Ingham County
- Federal Building (Port Huron, Michigan), NRHP-listed
- Old Federal Building (Sault Ste. Marie), NRHP-listed

=== Minnesota ===
- Bishop Henry Whipple Federal Building, Ft. Snelling, Minnesota

=== Missouri ===
- United States Post Office (Hannibal, Missouri), also known and NRHP-listed as "Federal Building"

=== Montana ===
- Federal Building (Kalispell, Montana), NRHP-listed in Flathead County
- Lewistown Federal Building & Post Office (1931), Lewistown, Montana, NRHP-listed in Fergus County

=== Nebraska ===
- North Platte U.S. Post Office and Federal Building, NRHP-listed
- Federal Office Building (Omaha, Nebraska), NRHP-listed

=== Nevada ===
- Federal Building and Post Office (Fallon, Nevada), NRHP-listed

=== New Jersey ===
- Federal Building and Courthouse (Camden, New Jersey), NRHP-listed in Camden County

=== New Mexico ===
- Federal Building and United States Courthouse (Albuquerque, New Mexico), NRHP-listed
- Federal Building (Santa Fe, New Mexico), NRHP-listed

=== New York ===
- Charles L. Brieant, Jr. Federal Building and Courthouse, White Plains, New York
- Federal Building and Post Office (New York, New York), NRHP-listed in New York
- Federal Building (Rochester, New York), NRHP-listed
- Jacob K. Javits Federal Building, New York, New York

=== North Carolina ===
- Alton Lennon Federal Building and Courthouse, Wilmington, North Carolina, NRHP-listed
- Charles R. Jonas Federal Building, Charlotte, North Carolina, NRHP-listed
- Federal Building (Raleigh, North Carolina), NRHP-listed
- Federal Building (Wilkesboro, North Carolina), NRHP-listed
- U. S. Post Office and Federal Building (Rockingham, North Carolina), NRHP-listed

=== Ohio ===
- Akron Post Office and Federal Building, Akron, Ohio, NRHP-listed
- Ralph Regula Federal Building and US Courthouse, Canton, OH
- Anthony J. Celebrezze Federal Building, Cleveland, Ohio
- John W. Bricker Federal Building, Columbus, Ohio
- Donald J. Pease Federal Building, Medina, Ohio, NRHP-listed in Medina County
- Federal Building (Youngstown, Ohio), NRHP-listed in Mahoning County
- Old Federal Building and Post Office (Cleveland, Ohio), NRHP-listed
- Old Post Office and Federal Building (Dayton, Ohio), NRHP-listed in Montgomery County
- US Post Office and Federal Building-Zanesville, Zanesville, Ohio, NRHP-listed

=== Oklahoma ===
- Federal Building and US Courthouse (Lawton, Oklahoma), NRHP-listed in Comanche County
- Alfred P. Murrah Federal Building, Oklahoma City, Oklahoma, former building destroyed in 1995 bombing
- Carl Albert Federal Building, McAlester, Oklahoma, NRHP-listed

=== Oregon ===
- 511 Federal Building, Portland, Oregon, NRHP-listed
- Edith Green – Wendell Wyatt Federal Building, Portland, Oregon, 18 stories
- U.S. Post Office and Federal Building (La Grande, Oregon), NRHP-listed in Union County

=== Rhode Island ===
- Federal Building (Providence, Rhode Island), NRHP-listed

=== South Carolina ===
- C.F. Haynsworth Federal Building and United States Courthouse, Greenville, South Carolina, NRHP-listed
- Strom Thurmond Federal Building and United States Courthouse, Columbia, South Carolina, NRHP-listed

=== South Dakota ===
- Federal Building and U.S. Courthouse (Sioux Falls, South Dakota), NRHP-listed

=== Tennessee ===
- Clarksville Federal Building, Clarksville, Tennessee, NRHP-listed in Montgomery County
- Federal Building (Maryville, Tennessee), NRHP-listed in Blount County
- Joel W. Solomon Federal Building and United States Courthouse, Chattanooga, Tennessee, NRHP-listed

=== Texas ===
- Federal Building (Abilene, Texas), NRHP-listed in Taylor County
- Hipolito F. Garcia Federal Building and United States Courthouse, NRHP-listed in Bexar County as "San Antonio US Post Office and Courthouse"
- J. J. Pickle Federal Building, Austin, Texas, NRHP-listed in Travis County
- Jack Brooks Federal Building, Beaumont, Texas, NRHP-listed
- Lubbock Post Office and Federal Building, Lubbock, Texas, NRHP-listed
- O. C. Fisher Federal Building, San Angelo, Texas, NRHP-listed in Tom Green County
- Old Federal Building and Post Office (Victoria, Texas), NRHP-listed in Victoria County
- Sam B. Hall, Jr. Federal Building and United States Courthouse, Marshall, Texas, NRHP-listed
- U.S. Post Office and Federal Building (Austin, Texas), NRHP-listed
- US Post Office and Federal Building (Port Arthur, Texas), NRHP-listed in Jefferson County
- US Post Office-Federal Building-Brenham, Brenham, Texas, NRHP-listed in Washington County
- Ward R. Burke U.S. Courthouse, Lufkin, Texas, also known and NRHP-listed in Angelina County as "Old Federal Building-Federal Courthouse"
- Earle Cabell Federal Building and Courthouse, Dallas, Texas, NHRP-listed

=== Utah ===
- Frank E. Moss United States Courthouse
- Wallace F. Bennett Federal Building

=== Vermont ===
- Old Bennington Post Office, Bennington, Vermont, also known as "U.S. Federal Building", NRHP-listed

=== Virginia ===
- C. Bascom Slemp Federal Building, Big Stone Gap, Virginia, NRHP-listed as "United States Post Office and Courthouse"

=== Washington ===
- U.S. Post Office and Courthouse (Bellingham, Washington), also known as "Federal Building", built during 1912–13, NRHP-listed
- U.S. Post Office and Customshouse (Everett, Washington), also known as "Federal Building", NRHP-listed in Snohomish County
- U.S. Post Office – Downtown Tacoma, Tacoma, Washington, NRHP-listed in Pierce County
- Federal Office Building (Seattle), a 1932 Art Deco building on the NRHP
- Henry M. Jackson Federal Building, Seattle, a 37-story Federal skyscraper built in 1974
- Richland Federal building, a seven-story building built in 1975, with post office and courthouse

=== Washington, D.C. ===
- Robert C. Weaver Federal Building (1961), Washington, D.C., NRHP-listed

=== West Virginia ===
- Elizabeth Kee Federal Building, Bluefield, West Virginia
- Federal Building and U.S. Courthouse (Wheeling, West Virginia, 1907)
- Robert C. Byrd Federal Building and U.S. Courthouse, Beckley, West Virginia
- Sidney L. Christie Federal Building, Huntington, West Virginia
- United States Courthouse and Federal Building (Parkersburg, West Virginia)

=== Wisconsin ===
- Federal Building (Milwaukee, Wisconsin), NRHP-listed
- United States Post Office and Courthouse (Eau Claire, Wisconsin), also known as "Federal Building and U.S. Courthouse", NRHP-listed

=== Wyoming ===
- Ewing T. Kerr Federal Building and U.S. Courthouse, Casper, Wyoming, NRHP-listed in Natrona County

== See also ==
- Federal Building and Post Office (disambiguation)
- List of United States post offices
- List of United States federal courthouses
