= National Register of Historic Places listings in Bonner County, Idaho =

Location of Bonner County in Idaho

This is a list of the National Register of Historic Places listings in Bonner County, Idaho.

It is intended to be a complete list of the properties and districts on the National Register of Historic Places in Bonner County, Idaho, United States. Latitude and longitude coordinates are provided for many National Register properties and districts; these locations may be seen together in an online map.

There are 16 properties and districts listed on the National Register in the county. More may be added; properties and districts nationwide are added to the Register weekly.

This National Park Service list is complete through NPS recent listings posted October 16, 2026.

== Current listings ==
	Name on the Register	Image	Date listed	Location	City or town	Description
1	W. A. Bernd Building	W. A. Bernd Building	August 18, 1983 (#83000282)	307–311 N. 1st Ave. 48°16′31″N 116°32′53″W	Sandpoint	
2	Co-op Gas & Supply Company	Co-op Gas & Supply Company	January 3, 2020 (#100004821)	524 West Church St. 48°16′26″N 116°33′19″W	Sandpoint	
3	Dover Church	Dover Church	August 8, 1989 (#86002153)	Washington Ave. between 3rd and 4th Sts. 48°14′53″N 116°36′22″W	Dover	
4	Hotel Charbonneau	Hotel Charbonneau	November 19, 1991 (#91001718)	88 Wisconsin St. 48°10′45″N 116°54′32″W	Priest River	
5	Lake Pend Oreille Lime and Cement Industry Historic District		March 27, 1997 (#94001450)	Roughly, discontiguous sites around Bayview and Lakeview; 47°58′59″N 116°33′15″W	Bayview	Extends into Kootenai County.
6	Lamb Creek School	Lamb Creek School	November 30, 1999 (#99001418)	28769 N. Highway 57; 48°31′34″N 116°56′20″W	Priest River	
7	Amanda Nesbitt House	Amanda Nesbitt House	July 15, 1982 (#82002508)	602 N. 4th Ave. 48°16′42″N 116°33′05″W	Sandpoint	
8	Charles A. and Mary Olson House	Charles A. and Mary Olson House	May 30, 2001 (#01000566)	401 Church St. 48°16′26″N 116°33′08″W	Sandpoint	
9	Priest River Commercial Core Historic District	Priest River Commercial Core Historic District	August 31, 1995 (#95001057)	Roughly bounded by Wisconsin, Montgomery, and Cedar Sts. and Albeni Rd. 48°10′45″N 116°54′27″W	Priest River	
10	Priest River Experimental Forest	Priest River Experimental Forest	July 1, 1994 (#94000661)	Idaho Panhandle National Forest; 48°21′09″N 116°47′49″W	Sandpoint	
11	Priest River High School	Priest River High School	December 7, 1995 (#95001402)	1020 W. Albeni Rd. 48°10′52″N 116°55′07″W	Priest River	Building is used by Priest River Junior High
12	Sandpoint Burlington Northern Railway Station	Sandpoint Burlington Northern Railway Station	July 5, 1973 (#73000682)	Cedar St. at Sand Creek; 48°16′35″N 116°32′44″W	Sandpoint	
13	Sandpoint Community Hall	Sandpoint Community Hall	September 11, 1986 (#86002148)	204 S. 1st Ave. 48°16′18″N 116°32′53″W	Sandpoint	
14	Sandpoint Federal Building	Sandpoint Federal Building	August 8, 2001 (#01000836)	419 N. 2nd Ave. 48°16′37″N 116°32′57″W	Sandpoint	
15	Sandpoint High School	Sandpoint High School	October 28, 1999 (#99001277)	102 S. Euclid Ave. 48°16′21″N 116°33′17″W	Sandpoint	Currently the Sandpoint Events Center
16	Sandpoint Historic District	Sandpoint Historic District	September 7, 1984 (#84001100)	Roughly bounded by Pine & Cedar Sts., 1st, 2nd & 3rd Aves. 48°16′32″N 116°32′54″W	Sandpoint	Boundary increase accepted June 21, 2018.
17	Settlement School	Settlement School	April 1, 1999 (#99000418)	Settlement Rd., 0.5 miles east of its junction with E. Side Rd. 48°10′55″N 116°52′28″W	Priest River	
18	Vinther and Nelson Cabin	Vinther and Nelson Cabin	July 21, 1982 (#82002507)	Eightmile Island; 48°34′47″N 116°50′19″W	Coolin	

== See also ==
- List of National Historic Landmarks in Idaho
- National Register of Historic Places listings in Idaho
