= Charbonneau (surname) =

Charbonneau is a surname of French origin given for a coal merchant, or as a nickname for someone with a dark complexion. People with that name include:

- Agnes Charbonneau (1897–1957), American politician
- Arthur Charbonneau (1939–2025), Canadian politician
- Bernard Charbonneau, French writer
- Christine Charbonneau (1943–2014), Canadian songwriter and singer
- Danielle Charbonneau (born 1953), Canadian radio personality
- David Charbonneau (born 1974), Canadian astronomer
- Ed Charbonneau (born 1943), American politician
- Eileen Charbonneau, American novelist
- Éric Charbonneau (born 1969), Canadian politician
- France Charbonneau, Canadian judge
- Francine Charbonneau (born 1962), Canadian politician
- Guy Charbonneau (1922–1998), Canadian politician and speaker of the Canadian Senate
- Henry Charbonneau (1913–1982), French far right politician and writer
- Howie Charbonneau (born 1955), American soccer player
- Jacques Charbonneau, Canadian politician
- Jean Charbonneau (1875–1960), Canadian poet
- Jean Baptiste Charbonneau (1805–1866), American explorer, son of Sacagawea and Toussaint Charbonneau
- Jean-Pierre Charbonneau (born 1950), Canadian politician
- Joe Charboneau (born 1955), American baseball player
- José Charbonneau (born 1966), Canadian ice hockey player
- Joseph Charbonneau (1892–1959), Canadian archbishop
- Kate Charbonneau (born 1993), Canadian figure skater
- Monique Charbonneau (1928–2014), Canadian artist
- Napoléon Charbonneau (1853–1916), Canadian lawyer, judge, and politician
- Olivier Charbonneau (1613–1687), French first settler of Île Jésus, Canada
- Pascal Charbonneau (born 1983), Canadian chess grandmaster
- Patricia Charbonneau (born 1959), American actress
- Paul-Émile Charbonneau (1922–2014), Canadian bishop
- René Charbonneau, 17th-century French medical missionary
- Rhona Charbonneau (1928–2017), American politician
- Simon Charbonneau (born 1988), Canadian racing driver
- Simon Charbonneau-Campeau (born 1988), Canadian football player
- Stéphane Charbonneau (born 1970), Canadian ice hockey player
- Steve Charbonneau (born 1973), Canadian football player
- Toussaint Charbonneau (1767–1843), Canadian explorer and member of the Lewis & Clark Expedition
- Yvon Charbonneau (1940–2016), Canadian politician

== See also ==
- Carbonneau (disambiguation), including people with that surname
- Charbonneau (disambiguation)
- Sacagawea, wife of Toussaint Charbonneau
