= Edward J. Schwartz United States Courthouse =

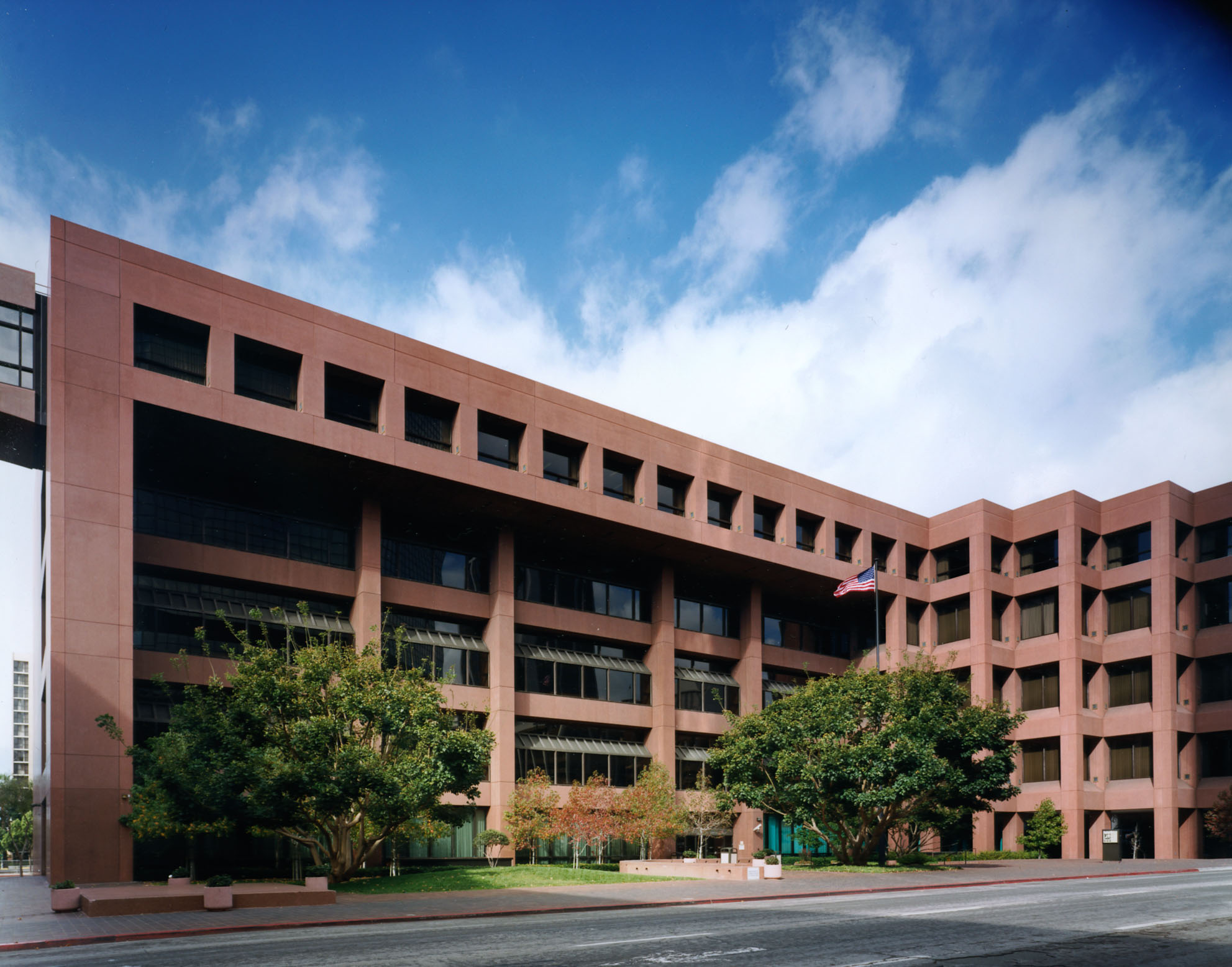

General information
- Location: 221 W. Broadway; San Diego, California, US
- Coordinates: 32°42′54″N 117°09′55″W
- Completed: 1975
- Client: District Court for the Southern District of California
- Owner: General Services Administration

Technical details
- Floor area: 895,000 sq ft (83,148 m^{2})

The Edward J. Schwartz United States Courthouse is a courthouse and a federal building located in San Diego, California. It is a courthouse for the United States District Court for the Southern District of California. The 103rd Congress designated the building under H.R. 3770 in 1994, which became Public Law 103-228. The courthouse is one of the busiest federal courthouses in the nation. The courthouse is 895,000 square feet (83,100 m^{2}) square feet.

The building is named for District Court Judge Edward Joseph Schwartz.

On May 4, 2008, Rachel Lynn Carlock and her boyfriend Donny Love Sr. placed a backpack containing three pipe bombs at the front door. The bombs went off without injuring anyone and only shattering the doors to the courthouse.

A proposed annex grew to become an additional federal court building, the James M. Carter and Judith N. Keep United States Courthouse.

== See also ==
- Federal buildings in the United States
