= Castle Museum =

Castle Museum may refer to:

- Castle Museum (Saginaw, Michigan) in Saginaw, Michigan
- York Castle Museum in York, England
- Castle Museum, Norwich, England
