= Charbonneau =

Charbonneau may refer to:

== People ==
- Charbonneau (surname)

== Places ==
- Charbonneau, North Dakota
- Charbonneau, Oregon

== Wine grapes ==
- Charbonneau (grape), another name for the French wine grape Douce noir
- Dolcetto, Italian wine grape that is also known as Charbonneau

== Other uses ==
- Centre Pierre Charbonneau, a sports arena in Montreal
- Charbonneau Commission, a commission of inquiry in Quebec, Canada into potential corruption in the management of public construction contracts
- Hotel Charbonneau, Priest River, Idaho
- Olivier-Charbonneau Bridge, on the Rivière des Prairies, between Laval and Montreal

== See also ==
- Carbonneau (disambiguation)
