= James M. Carter and Judith N. Keep United States Courthouse =

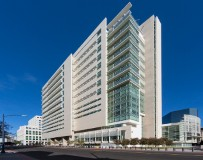
- James M. Carter and Judith N. Keep United States Courthouse

General information
- Location: 333 West Broadway; San Diego, California; United States
- Coordinates: 32°42′54″N 117°09′58″W
- Completed: 2012
- Client: District Court for the Southern District of California
- Owner: General Services Administration

Technical details
- Floor area: 467,000 sq ft (43,386 m^{2})

Other information
- Public transit: Courthouse station

The James M. Carter and Judith N. Keep United States Courthouse, also known simply as the Carter-Keep Courthouse, is a federal courthouse in San Diego, California. It is a sixteen-story facility on 2.6 acres (11,000 m^{2}) that includes courtrooms, judges chambers, offices and courtroom galleries of the United States District Court for the Southern District of California, along with offices of the Internal Revenue Service and the General Services Administration.

== History ==
Construction was completed in 2012. When the building opened in March 2013 it was San Diego's third federal courthouse. It was named for two former judges of the court, James M. Carter and Judith N. Keep, at a ceremony on March 30, 2015. U.S. representatives Susan Davis and Scott Peters sponsored the federal legislation to name the building for the two judges after surveying local community groups. The building is owned by the General Services Administration. and is 320 ft (98 m) tall and contains 467,000 square feet of floorspace.

In March 2009, President Obama signed legislation allocating $110 million to build a new courthouse. The total cost of the new building was $368.7 million. The building is located to the west of the Edward J. Schwartz United States Courthouse, and north of the U.S. Bankruptcy Court.

== Structure ==
The building was designed by Michael Palladino of Richard Meier and Partners of New York. Natural lighting reaches all the interior spaces and some enjoy natural ventilation as well. The building "triumphs", wrote one critic, "as a graceful departure from the lumpish mediocrity of its neighbors, as a guardian of green space at the heart of the city, and by transforming public perceptions of the law in action". The San Diego Architectural Foundation criticized the GSA for demolishing an historically significant structure, the Hotel San Diego, to clear the land for construction of the courthouse. That hotel had been built in 1914 by sugar magnate John D. Spreckels, a key figure in the early development of the city.

The structure won a National Architecture and Engineering Award from the American Institute of Steel Construction and LEED Gold certification from the U.S. Green Building Council. The project also won an Award of Merit from Engineering News-Record in the Government/Public Building category of its California's Best Projects Competition for 2013. It received the San Diego Architectural Foundation Orchid Award, San Diego Architectural Foundation for 2013.

Artist and San Diego resident Robert Irwin produced two works on commission from the GSA. A 33-foot-tall highly polished obelisk called "Prism" is located in the lobby. It is constructed of transparent acrylic. A ramp of hedges that zigzag across the outdoor plaza is called "Hedge Wedge". Three large, boldly-colored panels by longtime San Diego artist Kim MacConnell have been installed in the Jury Assembly hall.
