= Coeur d'Alene Federal Building =

- U.S. National Register of Historic Places
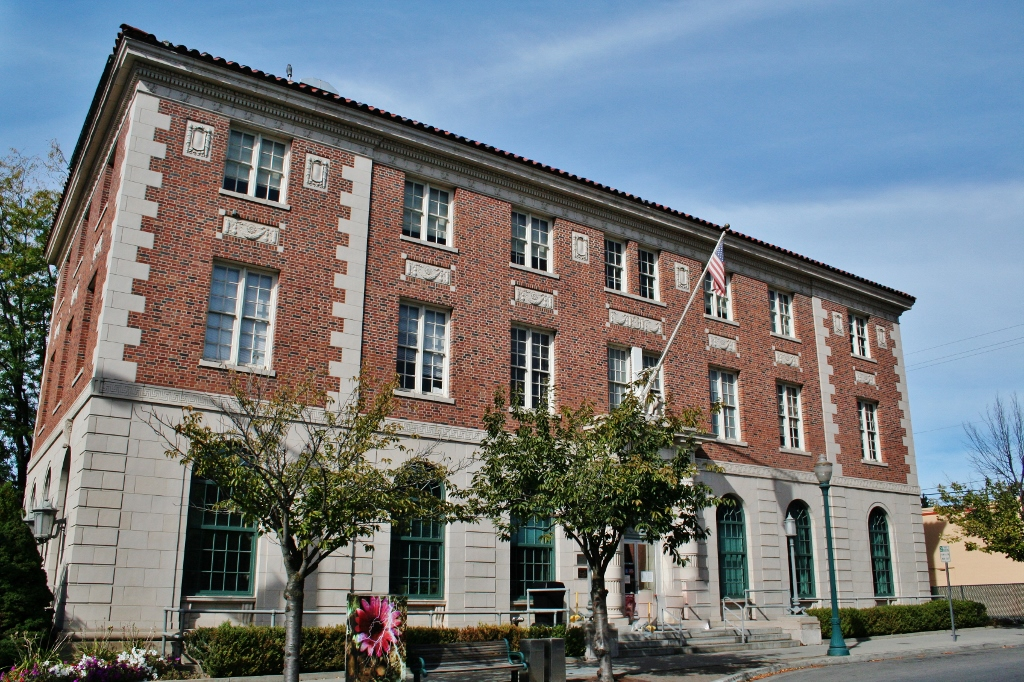

- Location within Idaho Location within the United States
- Location: 205 N. 4th St., Coeur d'Alene, Idaho
- Coordinates: 47°40′29″N 116°46′49″W
- Area: less than one acre
- Built: 1927
- Built by: L.L. Welch
- Architectural style: Federal, Adamesque
- NRHP reference No.: 77000461
- Added to NRHP: December 16, 1977

The Coeur d'Alene Federal Building is a historic building built in 1927 in Coeur d'Alene, Idaho. It was listed on the National Register of Historic Places in 1977.

It is a three-story cast stone and brick Federal building, built in Adamesque style. It has round arched openings in its first story, cast stone quoins, and a terra cotta portico. Of federal buildings in the state, it was regarded as a "fine structure, one of the most elegant in Idaho."
