= Federal Courthouse and Post Office (Mankato, Minnesota) =

- U.S. National Register of Historic Places
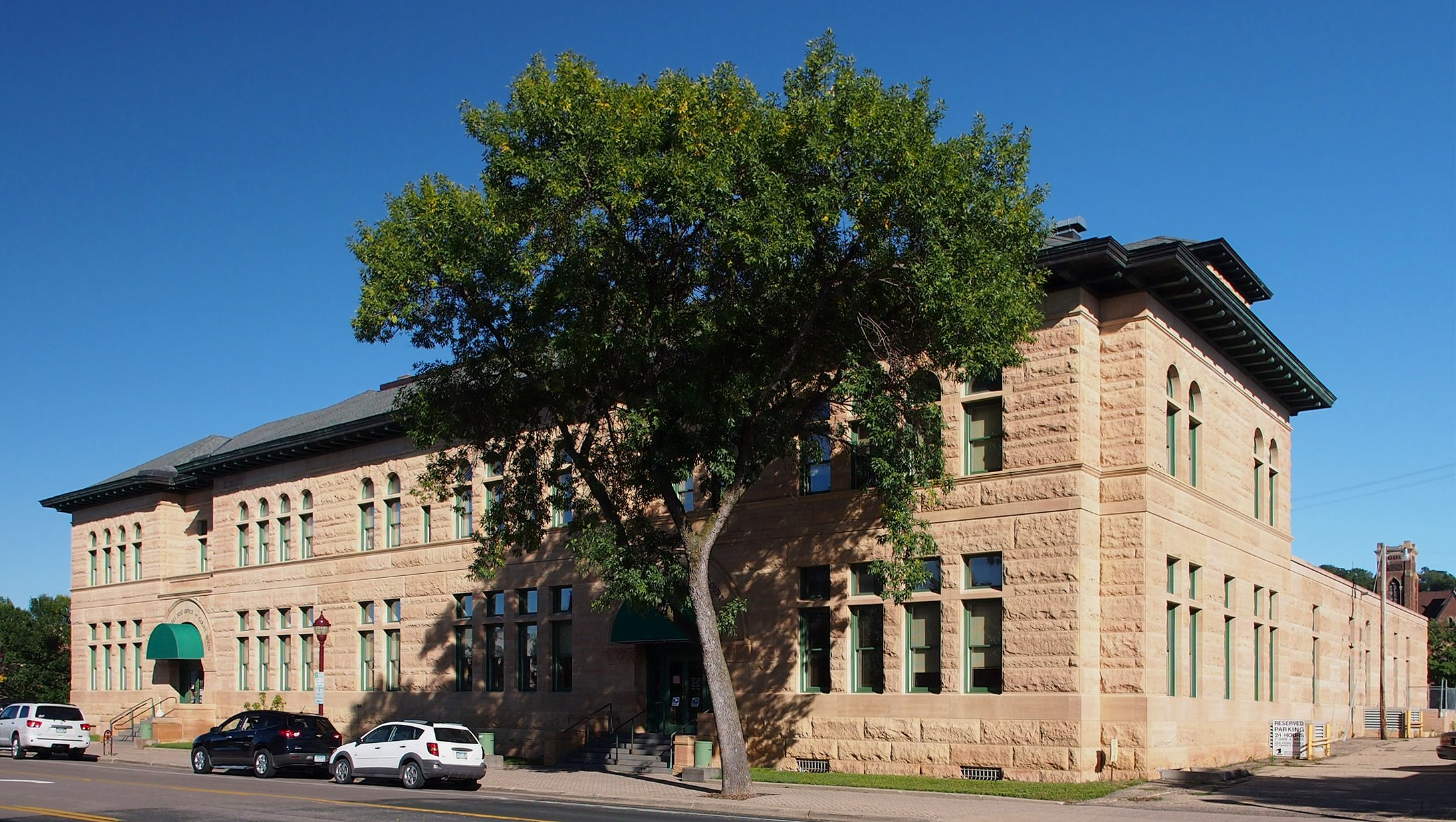
- The Federal Courthouse and Post Office from the west

- Location within Minnesota Location within the United States
- Interactive map of Federal Courthouse and Post Office
- Location: 401 S. 2nd St., Mankato, Minnesota
- Coordinates: 44°9′49″N 94°0′14″W
- Area: less than one acre
- Built: 1896, 1932, 1965
- Architect: William Martin Aiken; Office of the Supervising Architect under James A. Wetmore
- Architectural style: Romanesque, Richardsonian Romanesque
- NRHP reference No.: 80001945
- Added to NRHP: June 17, 1980

The Federal Courthouse and Post Office in Mankato, Minnesota, United States, was built in 1896 and expanded in 1932 and 1965. It is designed in Romanesque or Richardsonian Romanesque style, originally with a tower, by Supervising Architect William Martin Aiken. Also known as Federal Post Office and Courthouse, it served historically as a courthouse and as a post office. It was listed on the National Register of Historic Places in 1980.

The 1932 expansion, designed by the Office of the Supervising Architect under James A. Wetmore, more than doubled the size of the building; the 1965 expansion to the rear, credited to Edward W. Novak, was less dramatic. Both expansions were compatible in style and materials.

Postal operations in the building ended in 2020. In 2023 a 6-foot-tall (1.8 m) bronze sculpture honoring postal workers was installed outside the building as part of Mankato's public art program. Titled "Delivering for You", the monument was funded by retired mail carrier Harold Weed and his wife Alice.
