= William Martin Aiken =

American architect (1855–1908)

- Born: April 1, 1855; Charleston, South Carolina, US
- Died: December 7, 1908 (aged 53)
- Occupation: Architect

William Martin Aiken (April 1, 1855 – December 7, 1908) was an American architect who served as Supervising Architect of the United States Treasury and during his appointment oversaw and participated in the design and construction of numerous federal buildings that now reside on the National Register of Historic Places.

== Early life ==
William Aiken was born in Charleston, South Carolina, and educated at The University of the South from 1872 to 1874. He taught at his alma mater in his last year of attendance and moved to Charleston to teach a special course in architecture. In 1877, he moved to Boston, MA and continued to teach Architecture at MIT until 1879. After leaving MIT, he served under in the office of noted American architect Henry Hobson Richardson and left in 1883 to serve under other architects until 1886. He left Boston to start his own practice in Cincinnati, Ohio.

== Supervising Architect ==
Aiken was appointed as Supervising Architect of the United States Treasury and sworn in on April 1, 1895. During his short tenure, he oversaw the design of many notable federal buildings such as the Denver and Philadelphia mints. He resigned his position on June 30, 1897, to practice architecture in New York with Bruce Price and act as a consultant architect to the City of New York.

== Death ==
Aiken died on December 7, 1908, during an operation at a New York City Hospital.

== Notable buildings ==
- Denver Mint (Initial Design) – Denver, Colorado, 1896
- the third Philadelphia Mint building, Philadelphia, Pennsylvania, 1896
- expansion of the Federal Office Building, New York City, 1896
- Pueblo Federal Building, Pueblo, Colorado, 1897
- Federal Courthouse and Post Office, Mankato, Minnesota, 1897
- Allegheny Post Office, Pittsburgh, Pennsylvania, 1897
- the Châteauesque United States Post Office, now the Castle Museum, Saginaw, Michigan, 1898
- Customs House Museum and Cultural Center, Clarksville, Tennessee, 1898
- alteration of New York City Hall, 1903
- bandstand, White Point Garden, Charleston, South Carolina, 1907
- East 23rd Street Bathhouse, New York City, with Arnold W. Brunner, 1907
- U.S. Post Office and Courthouse, San Francisco, California
- The Aiken Ell, Thomas Crane Public Library, Quincy, Massachusetts, 1908

Preceded by Jeremiah O'Rourke	Office of the Supervising Architect; 1895–1897	Succeeded by James Knox Taylor
