= Amanda Nesbitt House =

- U.S. National Register of Historic Places
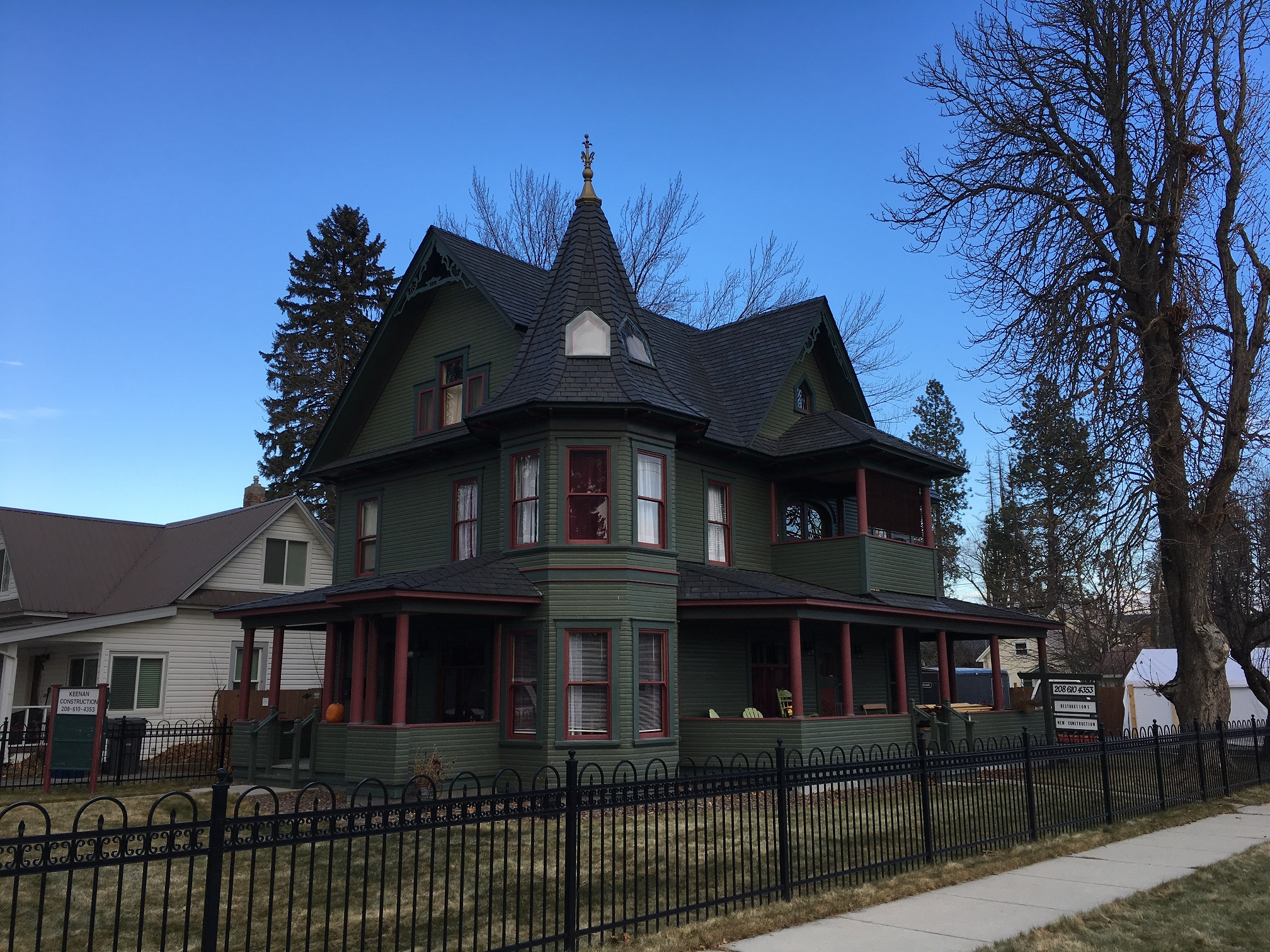

- Location within Idaho Location within the United States
- Location: 602 N. 4th Ave. Sandpoint, Idaho
- Coordinates: 48°16′42″N 116°33′05″W
- Area: less than one acre
- Built: 1906
- Architectural style: Queen Anne
- NRHP reference No.: 82002508
- Added to NRHP: July 15, 1982

The Amanda Nesbitt House, at 602 N. 4th Ave. in Sandpoint, Idaho, was built in 1906. It was listed on the National Register of Historic Places in 1982 as Dan Tanner House, and the official listing name was changed in 1987.

It is Queen Anne in style.

The main NRHP text and photos available are identified as for Dan Tanner House at that address. The name of the listing was changed in 1987 to Amanda Nesbitt House, with info that: "The Amanda Nesbitt House was constructed for Amanda Nesbitt as a combined dwelling and boarding house. Nesbitt, the widow of John Valencourt Nesbitt, raised her three boys there, supported her family by taking in boarders, and was active locally in the W.C.T.U. and the Methodist Church. In 1913 she married Adolph S. Stebbins."
