= Castle Museum of Saginaw County History =

- Castle Station
- U.S. National Register of Historic Places
- Michigan State Historic Site
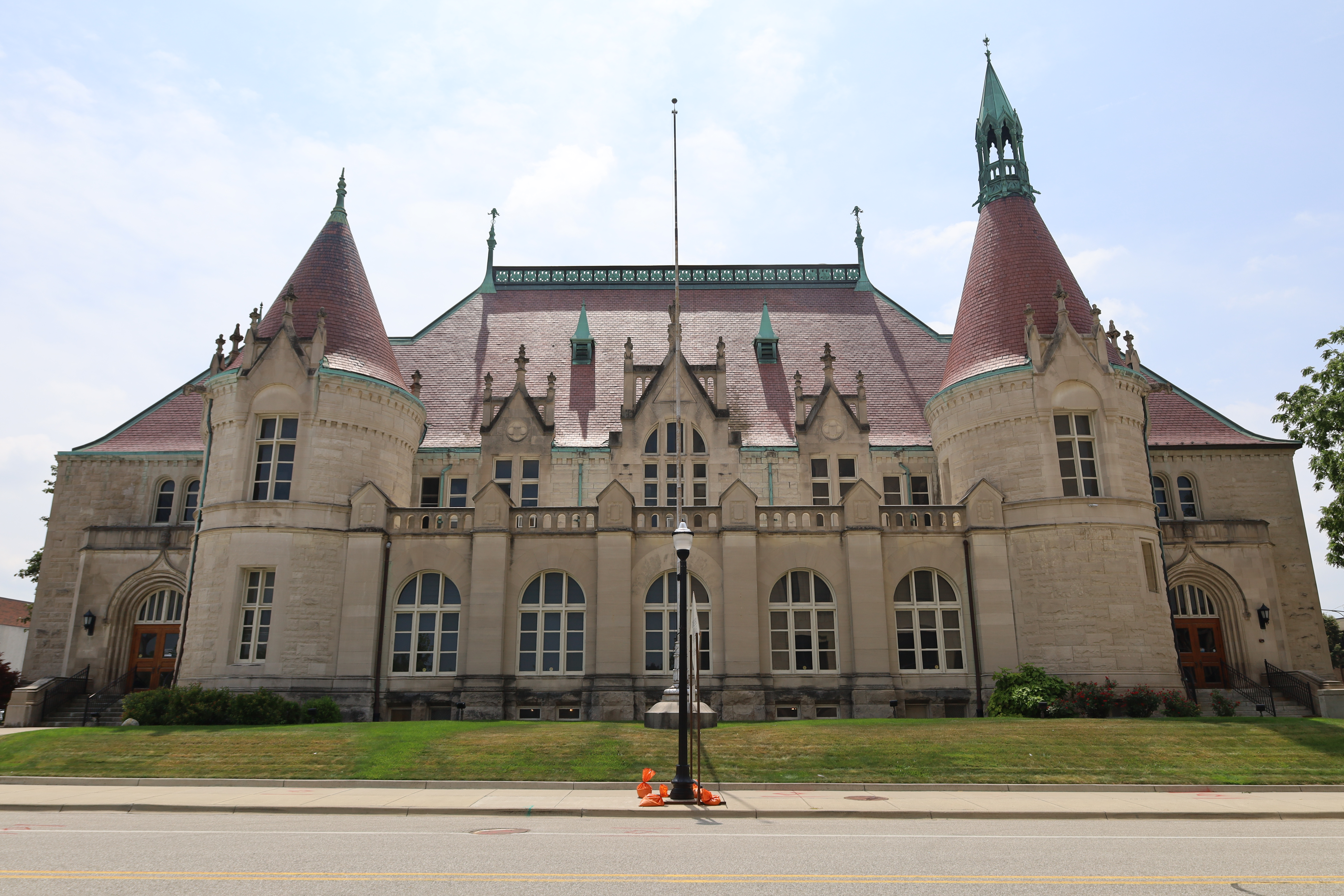
- The Castle Museum of Saginaw County History

- Location within Michigan Location within the United States
- Interactive map showing the location of Castle Station
- Location: 500 Federal Ave., Saginaw, Michigan
- Coordinates: 43°25′52″N 83°56′08″W
- Area: 1.4 acres (0.57 ha)
- Built: 1898; 128 years ago
- Architect: William Martin Aiken, Carl Macomber
- Architectural style: Renaissance
- Website: www.castlemuseum.org
- NRHP reference No.: 72000652
- Added to NRHP: January 13, 1972

The Castle Museum, previously known as Castle Station or Saginaw Post Office, is a historic structure in Saginaw, Michigan, United States. It is listed on the National Register of Historic Places. It is currently the home of the Historical Society of Saginaw County and officially known as the Castle Museum of Saginaw County History.

== History ==
The Castle Museum was designed by William Martin Aiken, Supervising Architect of the U.S. Treasury, and built in 1898 as a United States Post Office under a federal building program to reflect the ethnic and cultural heritage of its community. Aiken used the influence of the European chateau to illustrate the Saginaw Valley's earliest white settlers—French fur traders and trappers—and combined it with decorations from the Italian Renaissance and Gothic periods.

The Castle Building was on the verge of extinction in the 1930s. Unable to keep up with Saginaw's growing mail business, the Castle Post Office Station was too small and plans were made to replace it. A decision was made to tear it down and build a new post office on its site. A storm of protests and a petition signed by 1,000 residents was sent to Washington, D.C.. The signers of the petition called the building “one of the best and most attractive buildings in Michigan” the replacement order was canceled in 1933. A final decision to demolish was made in February 1935 more protests followed and a compromise was made on February 17, 1935 the building would be extensively remodeled. The building was remodeled by local architect Carl Macomber, who enlarged the building by adding wings on both ends using limestone from the same quarry as the original building, tore down one of the three turrets, and added a large sorting room on the back of the building by Hoyt Library. Construction was completed in 1937 and Postmaster General James A. Farley labeled the building “memorial to President Roosevelt”.

In the 1970s, a new post office was built and the building was almost demolished once again, but local citizens and the Saginaw County Board of Commissioners took steps to list the building on the National Register of Historic Places to ensure the preservation of the building and the local heritage it represents.

== Exhibits ==
Some of the interesting items on permanent display include a 1914 Saginaw cyclecar, archaeology exhibit, and a lumbering exhibit. The museum changes displays on a regular basis and nearly all have a Saginaw connection.

== Gallery ==
=== Building exterior ===
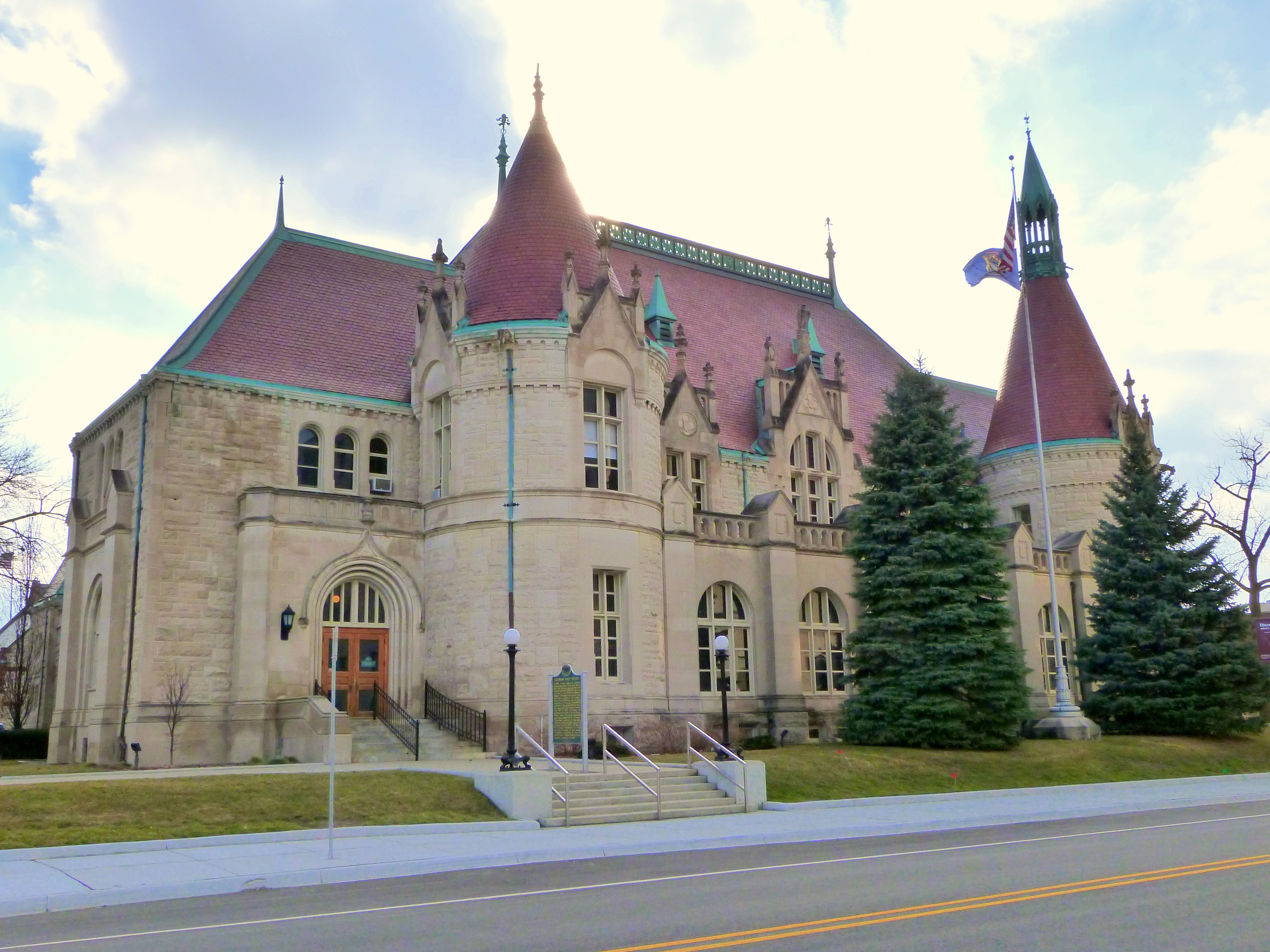

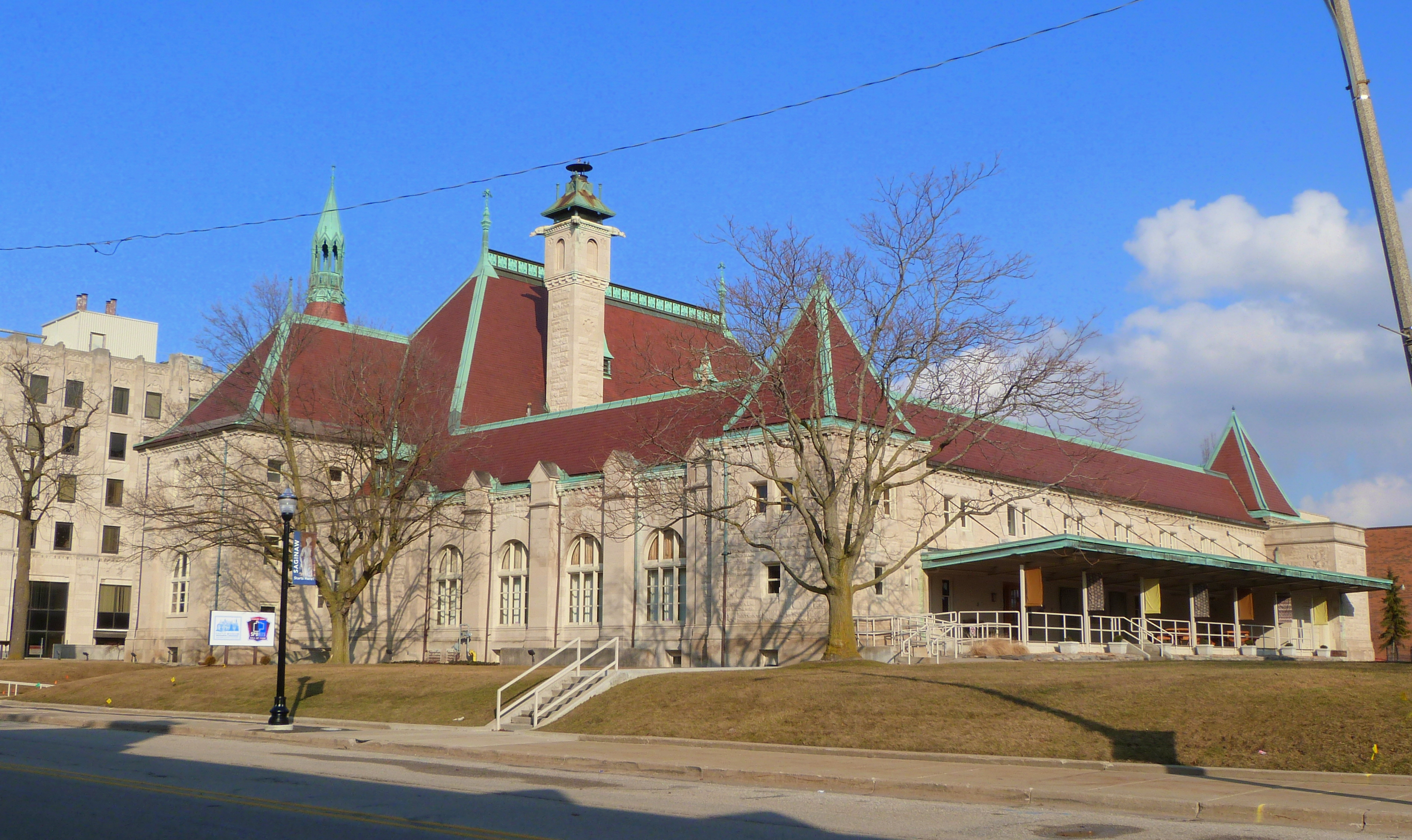

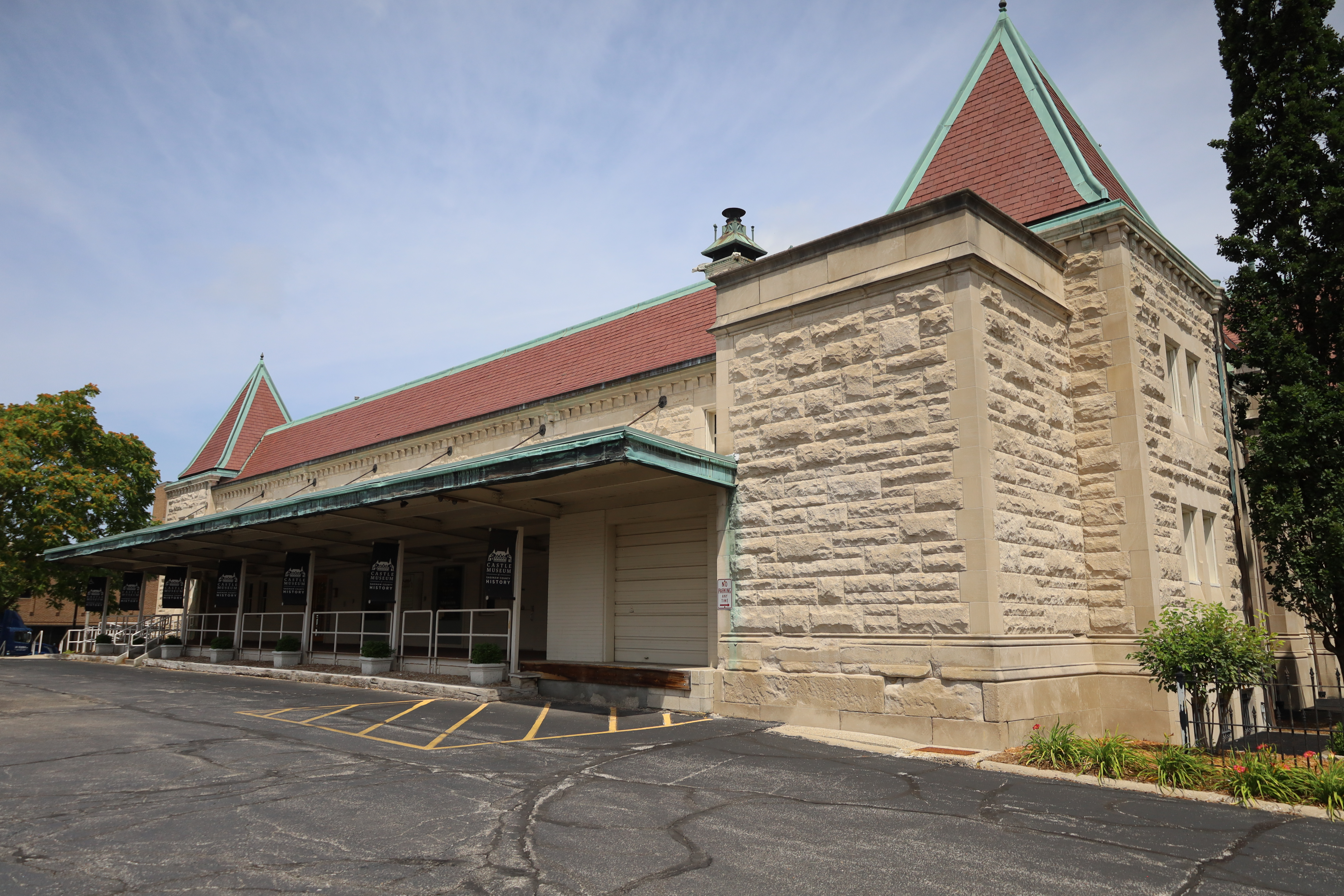

=== Interior and exhibits ===
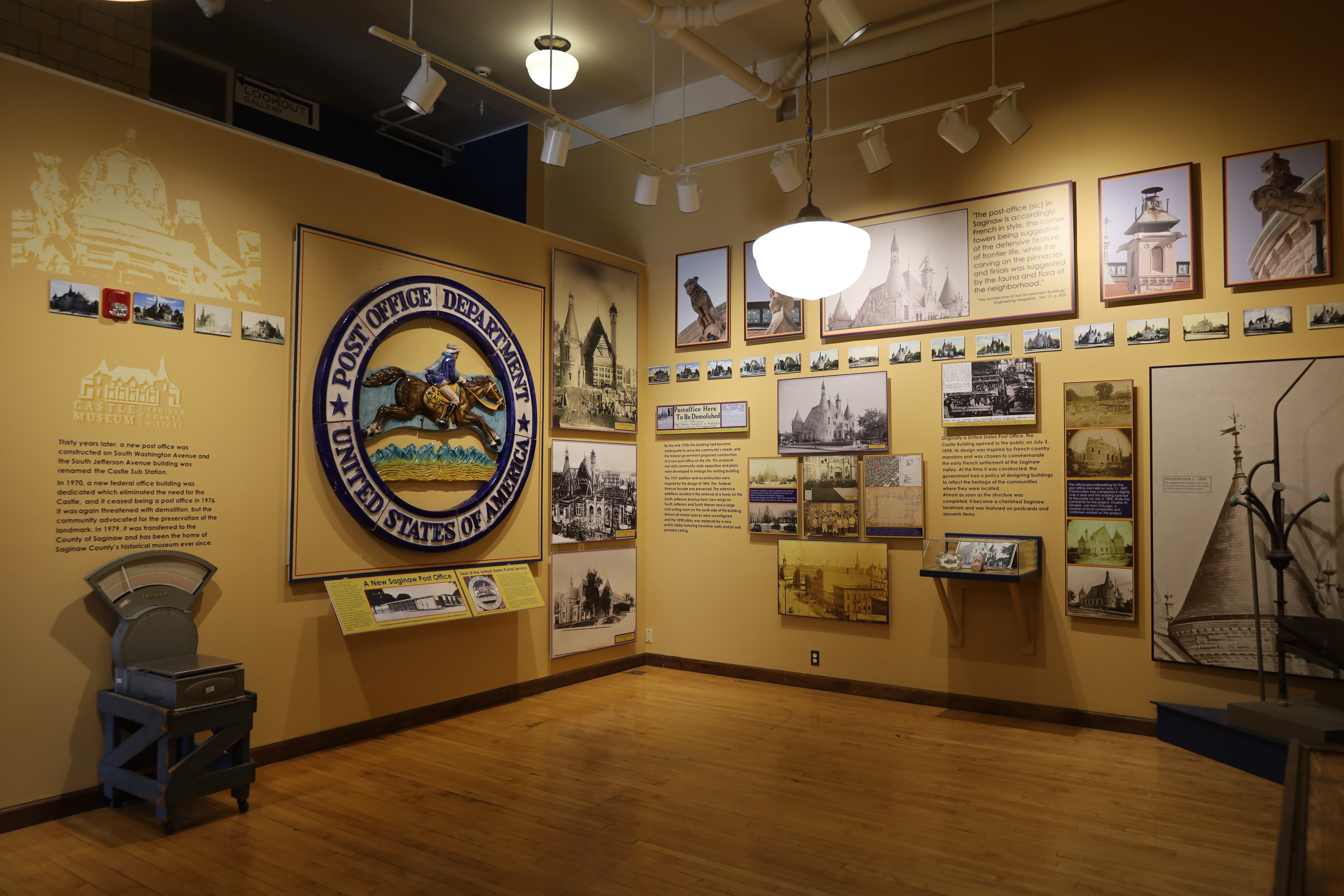

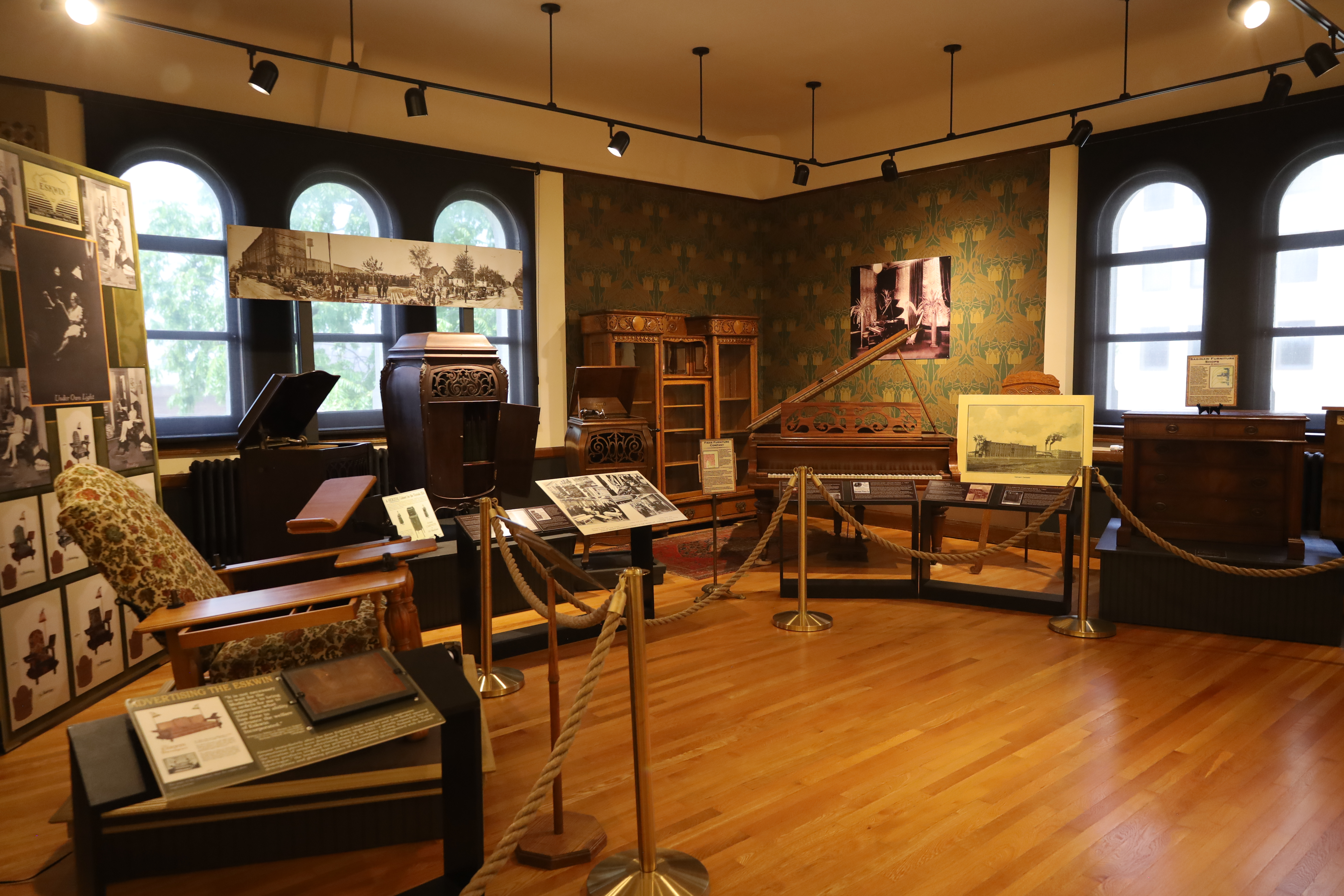

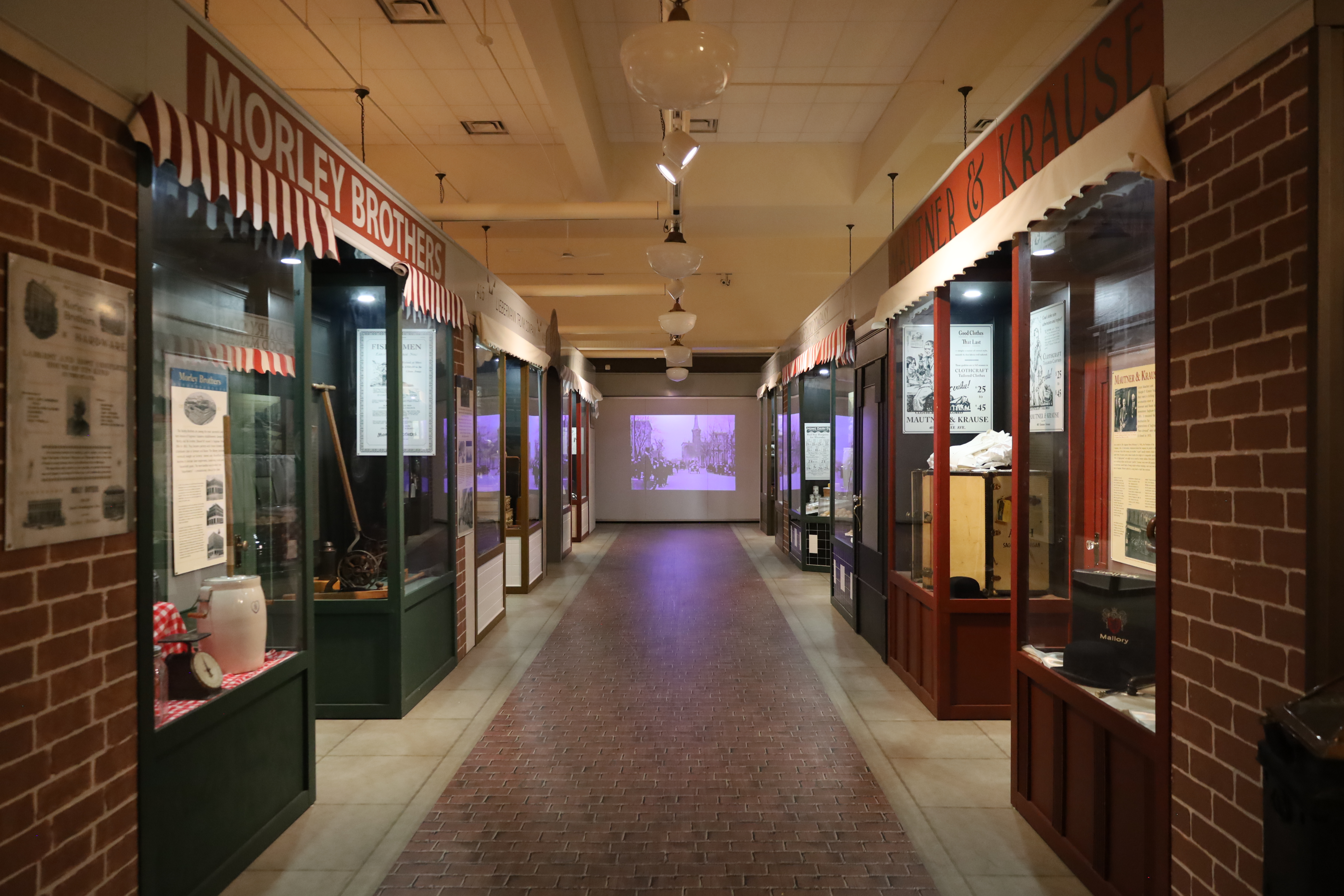
