= Carbonneau =

Carbonneau is a French surname. Notable people with the surname include:

- Guy Carbonneau (born 1960), Canadian professional ice hockey player
- Jacques Carbonneau (1928–2007), Canadian Olympic cross-country skier
- Justin Carbonneau (born 2006), Canadian ice hockey player
- Léo Carbonneau (born 2004), French rugby union player
- Onésiphore Carbonneau (1852–1932), Canadian merchant and political figure in Quebec
- Philippe Carbonneau (born 1971), French rugby player

== See also ==
- Carbonneau (grape), another name for the French wine grape Douce noir
- Guy Carbonneau Trophy
- Charbonneau (disambiguation)
