= Monique Charbonneau =

Canadian artist

- Born: 1928
- Died: 2014 (aged 85–86)
- Known for: artist

Monique Charbonneau (1928–2014) was a Canadian artist, known for her etchings, lithographs, lyrical wood engravings and gouache paintings. She designed the Canada Post stamp to commemorate the life and work of Quebec poet Emile Nelligan (1879–1941) with the illustration of his poem Le vaisseau d'or (The Golden Ship). She is one of several artists from Quebec that author Maria Tippett says derived their inspiration from nature.

== Career ==
Charbonneau (born Montreal) studied at the Ecole des Beaux-Arts, Montreal with Alfred Pellan (1950–1952); at the Ecole du Louvre, Paris (1958–1959); and Albert Dumouchel (1959–1964); with Toshi Yoshida, Tokyo (1973); and at the Ateliers Desjobert, Paris (1975). Her solo shows included: Galerie Agnès Lefort, Montreal (1960, 1961, 1963, and 1965); Musée d'art contemporain de Montréal (1965); Carmen Lamanna Gallery, Toronto (1966); Galerie Images-Faseb, Ottawa (1979) and others. She has taken part in many international exhibitions and biennials.

Her work is included in the collections of the National Gallery of Canada, the Tate Museum, London the Victoria & Albert Museum, London, and the Musée national des beaux-arts du Québec. She was a member of the Assoc. des graveurs du Québec (Pres. 1973–1974); and Soc. des Artistes Prof. du Qué. (1972). She lived in St-Antoine-sur-Richelieu, Quebec.
