= J.J. Pickle Federal Building =

High-rise building in Austin, Texas, U.S.

Coordinates: 30.2694°N 97.7391°W

General information
- Architectural style: International Style
- Location: 300 East 8th Street, Austin, Texas

Height
- Height: 152 feet

Technical details
- Floor count: 11

The J.J. Pickle Federal Building is a high-rise building in Austin, Texas, United States. It is one of the largest mid-century modern buildings in Texas. The building is known for its famous occupants, including Congressman J. J. Pickle and President Lyndon B. Johnson.

The building occupies the entire block on 8th street between San Jacinto Boulevard and Trinity Street in downtown Austin, Texas. There is an outdoor plaza on the north half of the site that connects to the first floor. The ground floor is at street level on 8th street.

== Construction ==
Construction on the J.J. Pickle Federal building and the neighboring Homer Thornberry Building was completed in 1965. The two buildings are connected via a tunnel under 9th street. The buildings were funded by the U.S. General Services Administration (GSA) at the same time as many other federal buildings after the Public Buildings Act of 1949 consolidated federal building programs into the GSA.

The design was a joint venture between architecture firms Page-Sotherland-Page and Brooks & Bar, and the construction was done by Warrior Construction Inc. The total cost of constructing the J.J. Pickle Federal Building was $9,800,739.

== Architecture ==
Exterior view, J.J. Pickle Federal building

The building is a single rectilinear volume set on a podium-like ground floor, surrounded by a concourse. The exterior walls are concrete, and the ground floor is polished granite. All four sides of the building are wrapped with a uniform exterior grid that frames the window openings with rows and columns of T-shaped concrete sections. The concrete openings taper to create a vertically oriented oblong hexagonal shape. This strategy "both softens and animates the building with enriched patterns of light and shadow".

The building has nine floors of office space, including the former offices of President Lyndon B. Johnson. There was a helipad on the roof for the president until it was removed in the 1980s. The ground floor combines additional office space and a small covered parking lot.

== Famous occupants ==
=== J. J. Pickle ===
In 1998 the previously unnamed federal building was named after politician J. J. Pickle, who worked in the building for almost thirty years. Pickle was an American congressman for over 25 years and was active in Austin's local politics.

Interior view of the LBJ suite of offices, JJ Pickle Federal Building

Interior view of the LBJ suite of offices, J.J. Pickle Federal Building

=== President Lyndon B. Johnson ===
The building is perhaps best known for housing the offices of President Lyndon B. Johnson, who used 13 offices on the western half of the 9th floor while he was president of the United States. The president's personal office, located in the northwest corner of the top floor, featured sweeping views of the city. The suite includes offices, a living space for the president, and a kitchen. All of the rooms are finished with dark stained-wood paneling and orange carpeting. At the president's request, almost every room had televisions to watch news broadcasts, including the restroom. The president also requested high-pressure shower heads.

Lyndon B. Johnson hosted the USSR for talks on SALT in these offices on December 6, 1966.

=== George W. Bush ===
George W. Bush had his campaign office in the J.J. Pickle Federal Building while running for office as the president of the United States.

== Preservation ==
Lyndon B. Johnson's suites on the 9th floor have been dutifully preserved with their 1960s furniture and décor. The entrance and hallways have also been preserved, with the only major changes to the building consisting of adding bricks to the plaza and solar panels to the roof.
