= Pueblo Federal Building =

- U.S. National Register of Historic Places
- Street view of the building

- Location within Colorado Location within the United States
- Location: 421 N. Main St., Pueblo, Colorado, United States
- Coordinates: 38°16′16″N 104°36′30″W
- Built: 1897
- Architect: William Aiken
- Architectural style: Late 19th and 20th Century Revivals, Italian Renaissance Palazzo
- NRHP reference No.: 78000881
- Added to NRHP: January 3, 1978

The Pueblo Federal Building is a historic government building in Pueblo, Colorado, built in 1897. The building served as a federal courthouse and post office. It was listed on the National Register of Historic Places in 1978.

It was designed by architect William Aiken. It was built at cost of $275,000. "The Post Office is characteristic of many other fine government structures constructed in the late 1800s, though it is the only example of this type of architecture in the region."
