= Lamb Creek School =

Historic school building in Idaho, United States

- U.S. National Register of Historic Places
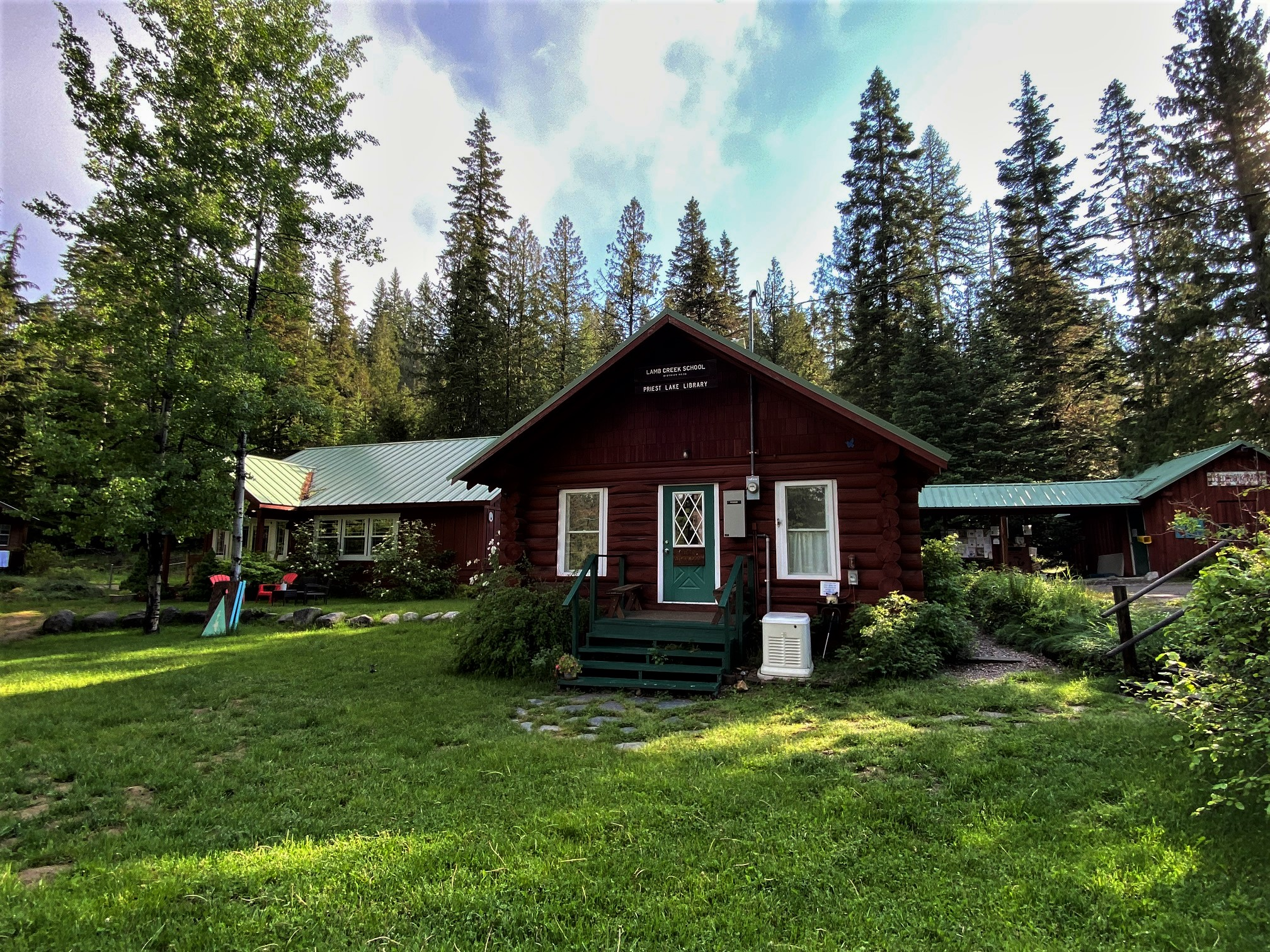

- Location within Idaho Location within the United States
- Nearest city: Priest River, Idaho
- Coordinates: 48°31′34″N 116°56′20″W
- Area: less than one acre
- Built: 1934
- Built by: Civilian Conservation Corps
- Architectural style: Rustic
- MPS: Public School Buildings in Idaho MPS
- NRHP reference No.: 99001418
- Added to NRHP: November 30, 1999

The Lamb Creek School, in Bonner County, Idaho near the city of Priest River, Idaho, was listed on the National Register of Historic Places in 1999.

It is a rustic one-story peeled log building built on United States Forest Service land in 1934 by a Civilian Conservation Corps battalion, to serve the increasing number of year-round residents in the area. Its gable front faces west. It served as a school until 1961, when it was consolidated into the Priest River School District. It was used as a teacherage thereafter, until 1974, then converted to become the Priest Lake Library. In 1995 the U.S. Forest Service transferred the parcel to a private owner, and it was to be deeded to the Library Board in 1998.

It is located at 28769 N. Highway 57, on the east side of the highway, about 28 miles (45 km) north of Priest River.
