= Priest River Commercial Core Historic District =

Historic district in Idaho, United States

- U.S. National Register of Historic Places
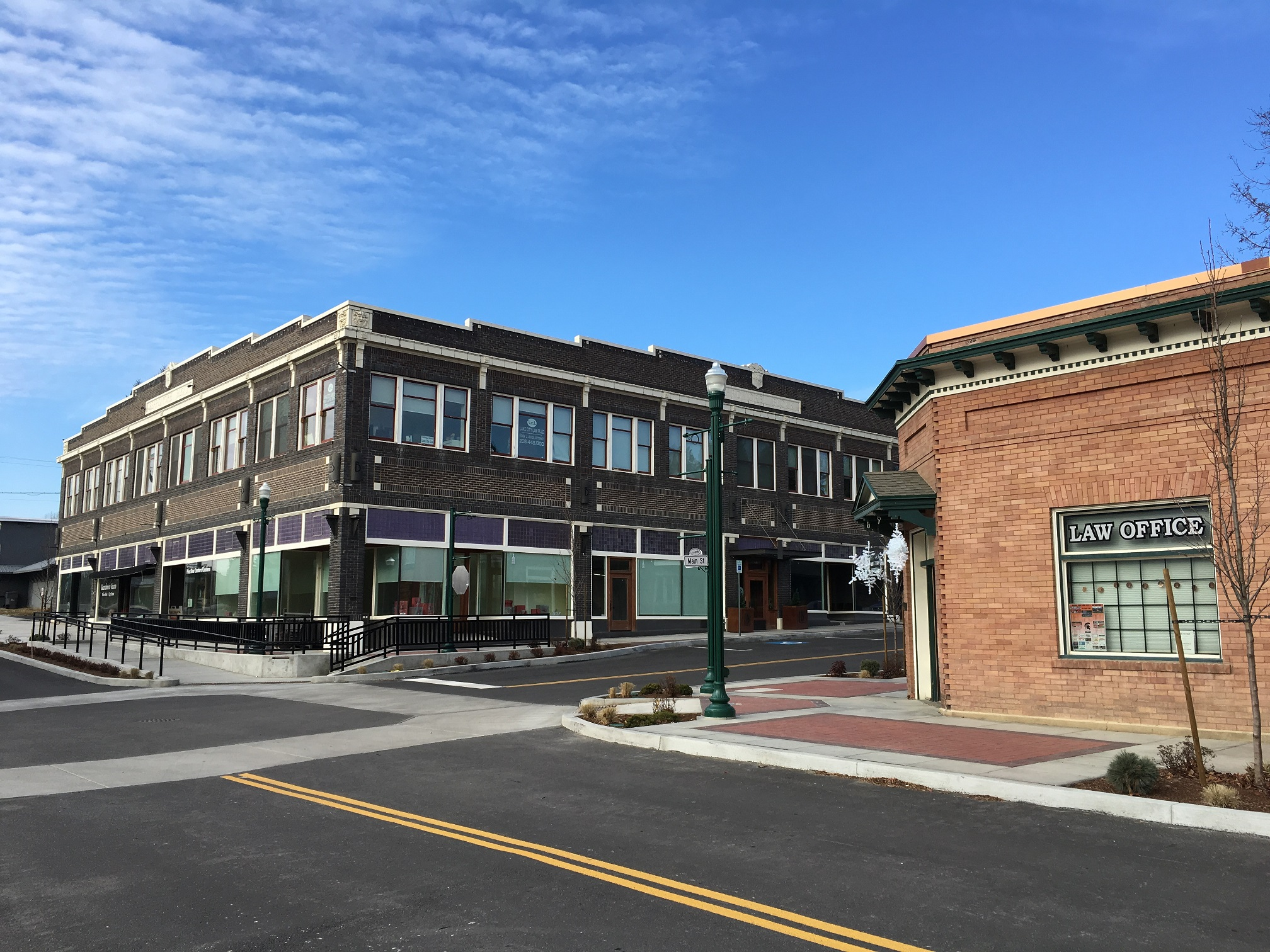

- Location within Idaho
- Location: Roughly bounded by Wisconsin, Montgomery, and Cedar Sts. and Albeni Rd., Priest River, Idaho
- Coordinates: 48°10′45″N 116°54′27″W
- Area: 0.5 acres (0.20 ha)
- Built: 1912-24
- NRHP reference No.: 95001057
- Added to NRHP: August 31, 1995

The Priest River Commercial Core Historic District, in Priest River, Idaho, is a historic district which was listed on the National Register of Historic Places in 1995. The listing included nine contributing buildings and a contributing structure on 0.5 acres (0.20 ha).

The district is roughly bounded by Wisconsin, Montgomery, and Cedar Streets and Albeni Road in Priest River.

The oldest contributing building is the Citizen's State Bank (1912); the newest is the Interstate Telephone Company Building (1924).
