= Federal Building-Courthouse (London, Kentucky) =

- U.S. National Register of Historic Places
- Federal Building-Courthouse in 2015

- Location within Kentucky Location within the United States
- Location: 300 S. Main St., London, Kentucky
- Coordinates: 37°7′39″N 84°4′57″W
- Built: 1911
- Architect: James Knox Taylor
- Architectural style: Italian Renaissance
- NRHP reference No.: 74000889
- Added to NRHP: August 19, 1974

The Federal Building-Courthouse in London, Kentucky is a courthouse of the United States District Court for the Eastern District of Kentucky. It was built in 1911 under the supervision of architect James Knox Taylor, and was listed on the National Register of Historic Places in 1974.

== Architectural description ==
The London, Kentucky, Federal Building and U.S. Courthouse was designed to house the U.S. Post Office, U.S. District Court facilities, and federal offices for the district. These functions were accommodated in a rectangular three-story plus basement building seventy-five feet long and forty-eight feet wide. A two-story half elliptical wing projects from the rear of the building reflecting the elliptical shape of the second floor court room.

The structure is masonry bearing wall with steel interior columns and beams supporting poured concrete floors. The roof structure is of steel and heavy timber supporting a wooden roof deck.

The exterior was designed in the Italian Renaissance style, utilizing granite blocks for foundation facing. The buff brick facing of the first floor has deep horizontal reveals terminated by a granite band at the second floor line. The second floor arched windows, enriched by small decorative balconies, are separated by flat brick pilasters that extend to the classic terra cotta cornice above the third floor window head, unifying the facades with elegant simplicity. While few exterior alterations have been made which effect the original facade design, one unfortunate change was the removal of large bronze wall-mounted light fixtures flanking the original doorways. These original light fixtures can be seen in early photographs and gave the main facade needed architectural detail at the entrance.

A broad flight of granite steps leads to the main entrance, which has been altered by the closing of two of the original three entrance doors. Originally these doors opened to the building lobby, which contained an open stairwell leading to the second floor, on which was located the building's most prominent architectural feature, the sixty-five foot long elliptical courtroom. This space containing most of its original simple heavy oak furnishings, remains almost as originally designed, the only major alteration being a floating, or swinging, elliptical ceiling, concealing the original coved plaster one above. When the U.S. Post Office moved out in 1961, the courts and other federal offices occupied the remaining areas of the second and third floors; the remainder of the building's interior was greatly altered in 1963.
