= United States Post Office and Courthouse (Bellingham, Washington) =

- U.S. Post Office and Courthouse
- U.S. National Register of Historic Places
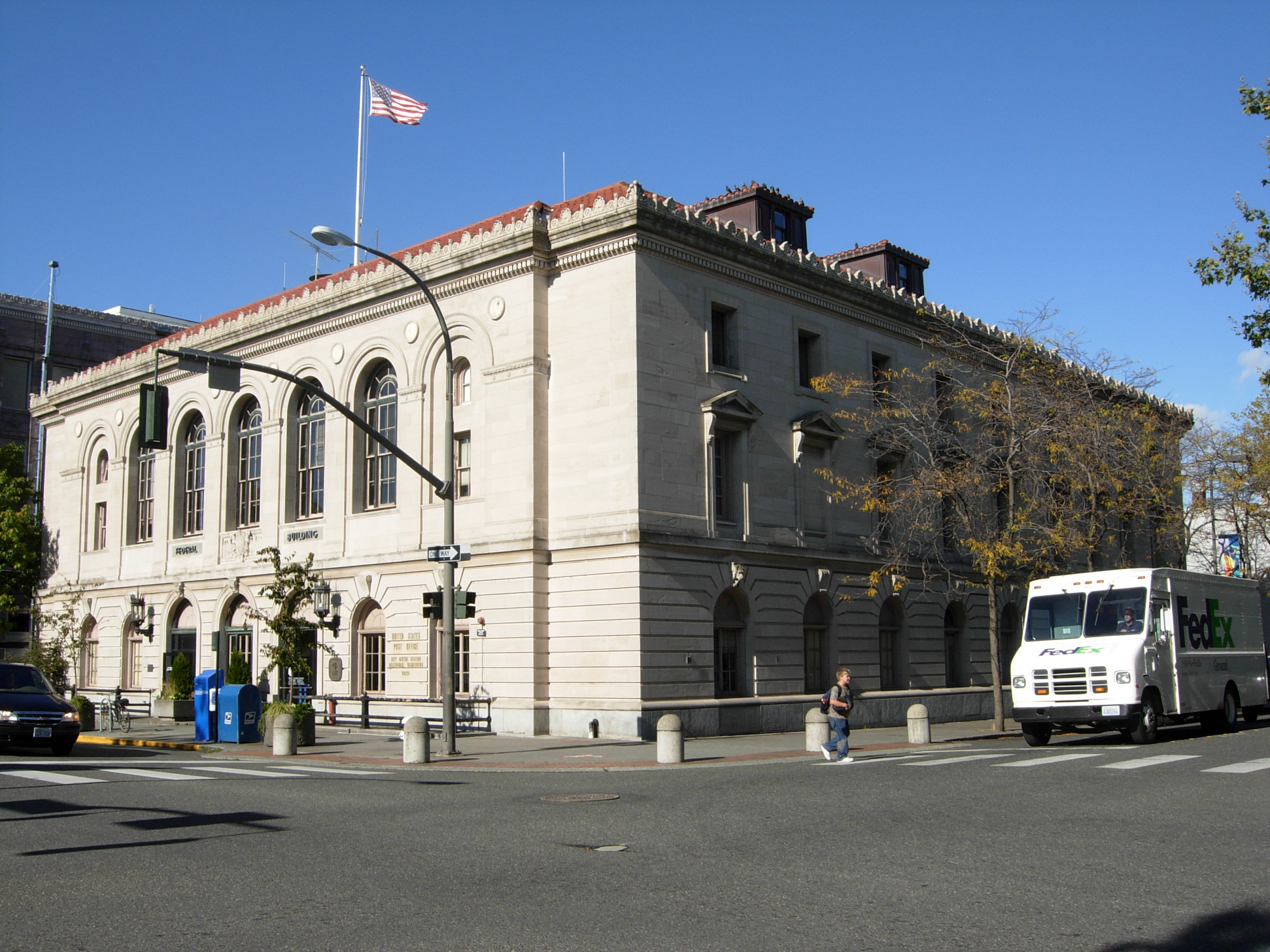

- Location within Washington (state)
- Location: 104 W. Magnolia St., Bellingham, Washington
- Coordinates: 48°45′5″N 122°28′35″W
- Built: 1912-13
- Architect: James Knox Taylor
- Architectural style: Renaissance
- NRHP reference No.: 79003157
- Added to NRHP: April 30, 1979

The U.S. Post Office and Courthouse in Bellingham, Washington, also known as the Federal Building, was built during 1912–13. It was designed by James Knox Taylor in Renaissance architecture style. It served historically as a courthouse, as a post office, and as a government office building. It was listed on the National Register of Historic Places in 1979.

It is a 4-story 122 feet (37 m) by 105 feet (32 m) building.
