= Customs House Museum and Cultural Center =

- Clarksville Federal Building
- U.S. National Register of Historic Places
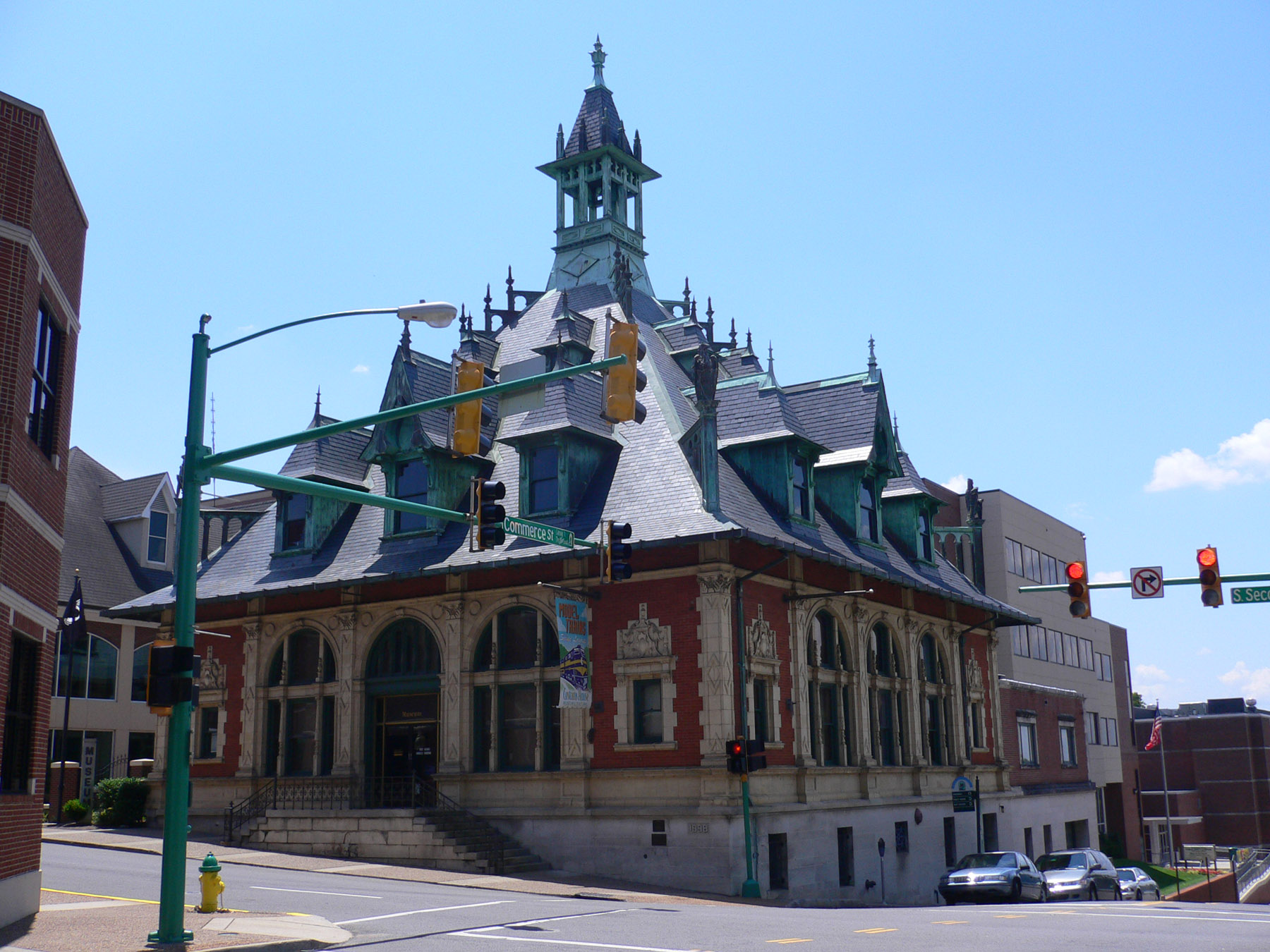
- Now known as the Customs House Museum and Cultural Center

- Location within Tennessee Location within the United States
- Location: Southwest corner of Commerce and S. 2nd Sts., Clarksville, Tennessee
- Coordinates: 36°31′34″N 87°21′31″W
- Built: 1897–1898
- Architectural style: Queen Anne/Stick Style
- NRHP reference No.: 72001246
- Added to NRHP: June 13, 1972

The Customs House Museum and Cultural Center is Tennessee's second largest general interest museum. It features fine art, history, and children's exhibits. It is located in Clarksville, TN's Downtown District on 200 South 2nd Street. It was listed on the National Register of Historic Places in 1972 as Clarksville Federal Building. It was established in 1984 as the Clarksville Montgomery County Museum.

== 1898 building ==
The 1898 portion of the Museum was originally designed for use as a Federal post office and custom house to handle the large volume of foreign mail created by the city's international tobacco business. It is built on the site of a former boarding house.

The structure was designed by the Supervising Architect of the Treasury, William Martin Aiken, in the eclectic style popular to Victorian America. Aiken incorporated many architectural styles including Stick, Queen Anne, Italianate, Romanesque, Flemish and Gothic. Its highly pitched roof with large eagles on the four corners, steep gabled windows and elaborate terra cotta ornamentation combine to give importance to a relatively small building. Contrary to popular myth, the design was not inspired by the architect's visit to China.

The building was constructed by Charles A. Moses of Chicago.
