= Sandpoint Historic District =

- U.S. National Register of Historic Places
- U.S. Historic district
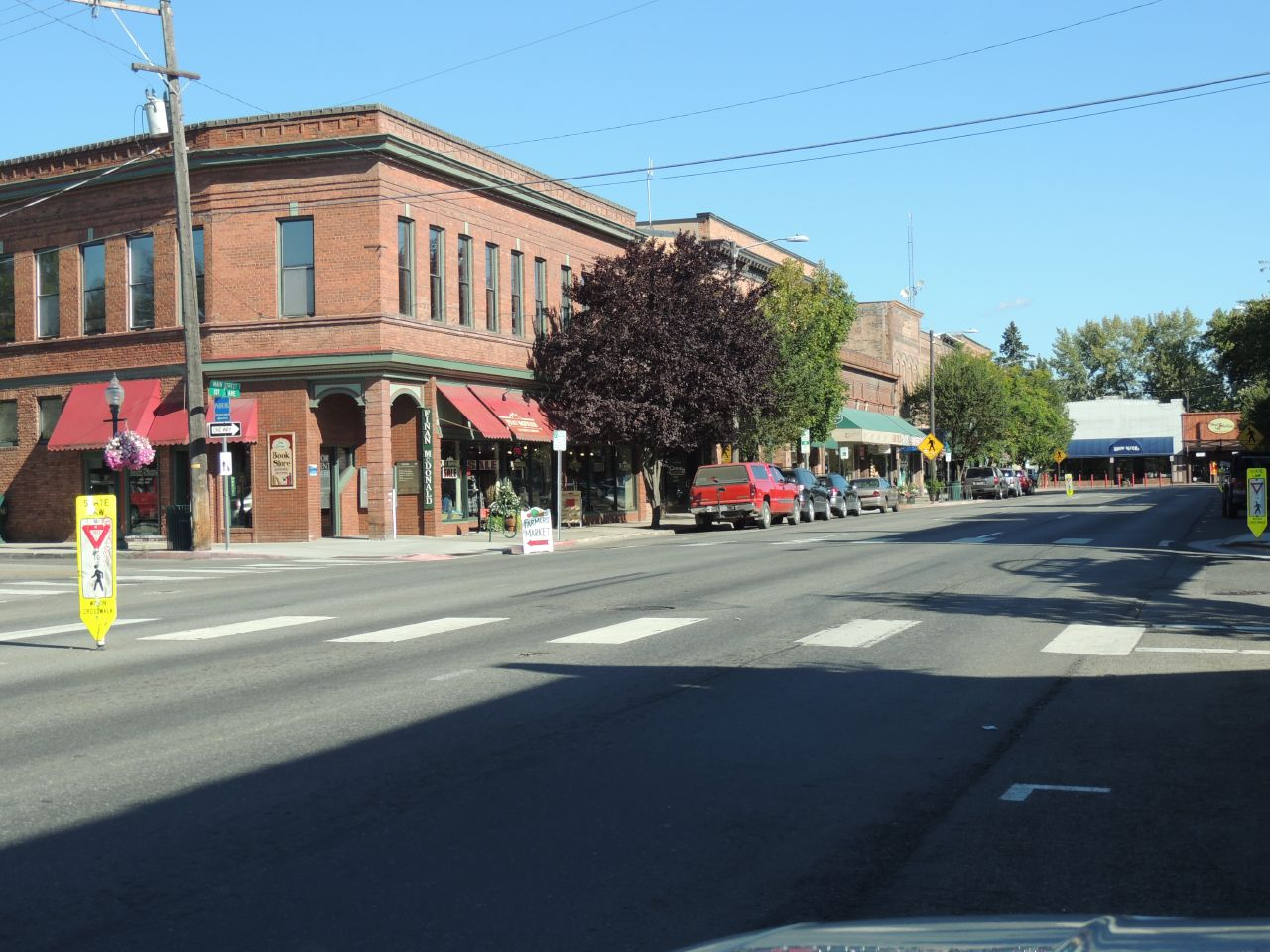

- Location within Idaho Location within the United States
- Location: Roughly 1st and 2nd Aves., Main and Cedar Sts., Sandpoint, Idaho
- Coordinates: 48°16′32″N 116°32′50″W
- Area: 3 acres (1.2 ha)
- Built by: Multiple
- Architectural style: Late 19th and 20th Century Revivals, Art Deco
- NRHP reference No.: 84001100 (original); 100002570 (increase)

Significant dates
- Added to NRHP: September 7, 1984
- Boundary increase: June 21, 2018

The Sandpoint Historic District in Sandpoint, Idaho is a historic district which was listed on the National Register of Historic Places in 1984, and enlarged in 2018. When first listed, it consisted of 13 buildings on the block bound by 1st and 2nd Avenues, Main St., and Cedar St., plus two other buildings across from the block.

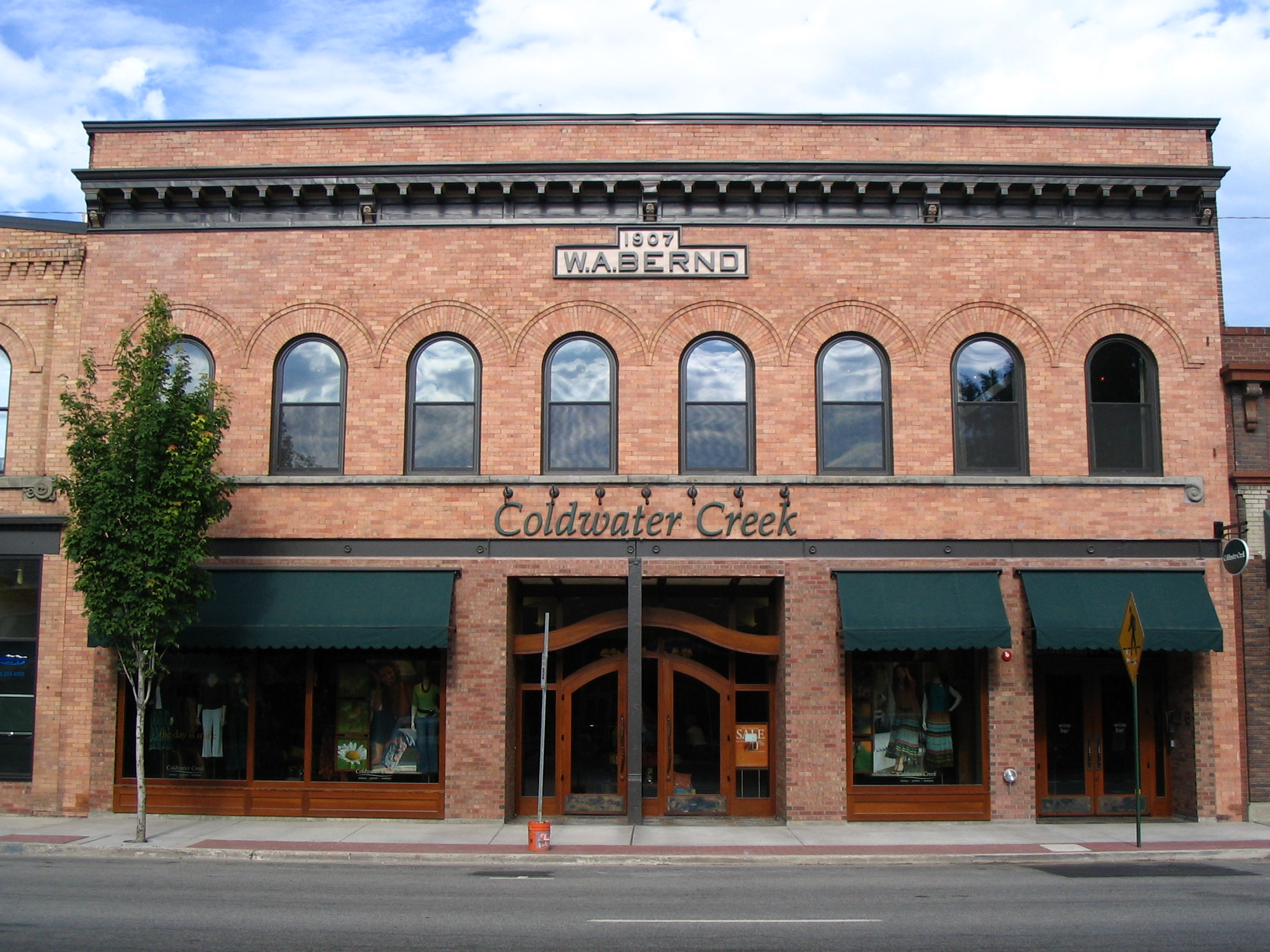
Bernd Building

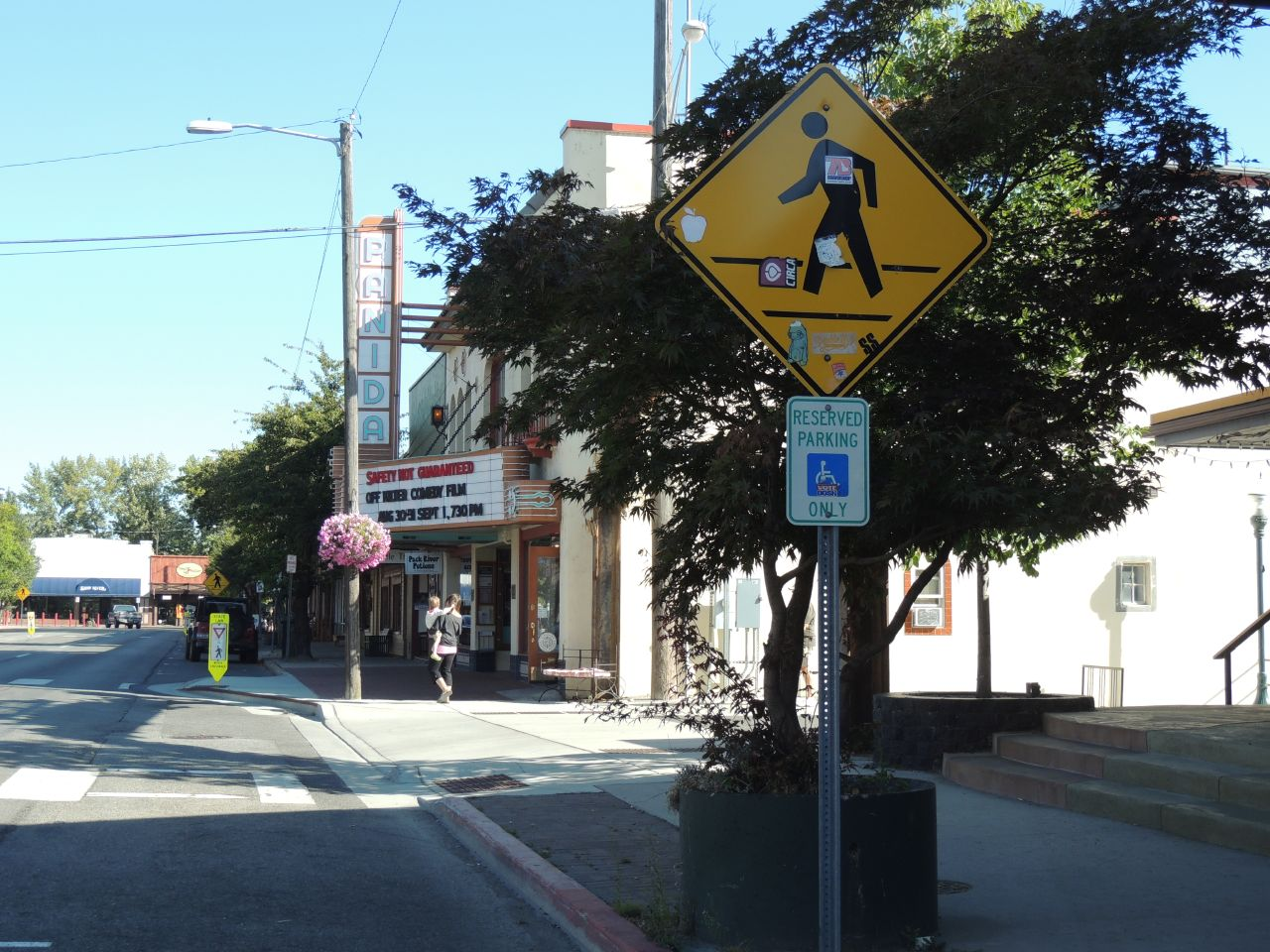
Panida Theater

It includes:

- W.A. Bernd Building (1907), 307-311 N. First Avenue, which was separately listed on the National Register in 1983.
- Sandpoint City Hall (1910), Second and Main
- Knights of Pythias Hall (1909), 202 Main Street, later the Sandpoint Sewing and Vacuum Center
- B.P.O.E. Lodge #1376 (1936), 314 N. Second Avenue
- Panida Theater(1927), 300 N. First Avenue
