= Sandpoint Federal Building =

- U.S. National Register of Historic Places
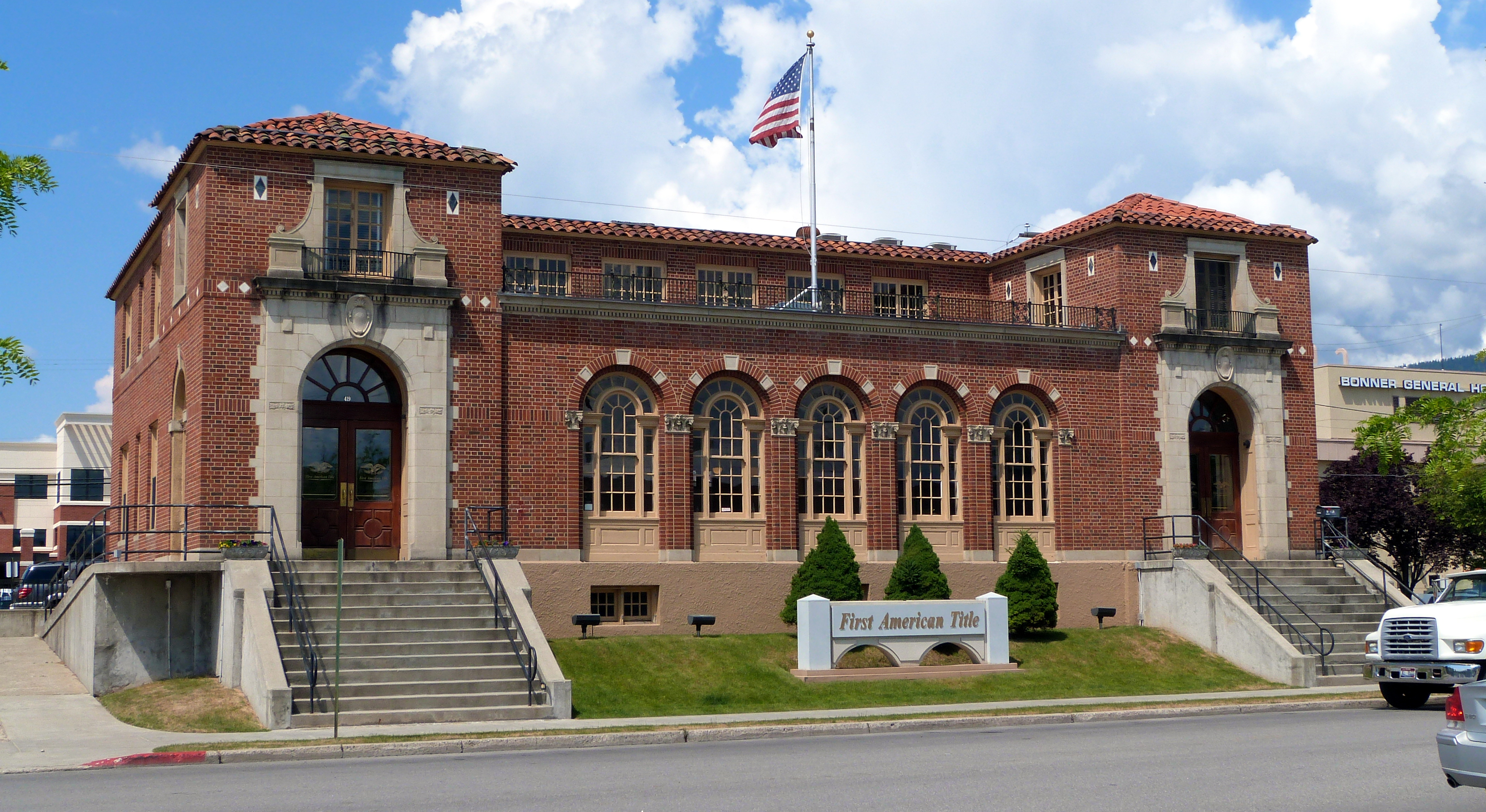

- Location within Idaho Location within the United States
- Location: 419 N. Second Ave., Sandpoint, Idaho
- Coordinates: 48°16′37″N 116°32′57″W
- Area: less than one acre
- Built: 1928
- Built by: Lovell, W.D.
- Architectural style: Spanish Colonial Revival, Italian Renaissance
- NRHP reference No.: 01000836
- Added to NRHP: August 8, 2001

The Sandpoint Federal Building, at 419 N. Second Ave. in Sandpoint, Idaho, was built in 1928. It was listed on the National Register of Historic Places in 2001.

The first floor was originally a post office, and was modified in the 1960s to serve as the East Bonner County Library.

Its architecture includes elements of Spanish Colonial Revival style, mostly in design details, and of Italian Renaissance Revival style, in its massing and symmetry. Both styles are rare in Idaho. Details include unglazed terra cotta ornamentation around window and door openings.

It was built by contractor W.D. Lovell.
