= Hotel Charbonneau =

Historic hotel in Priest River, Idaho, US

- U.S. National Register of Historic Places
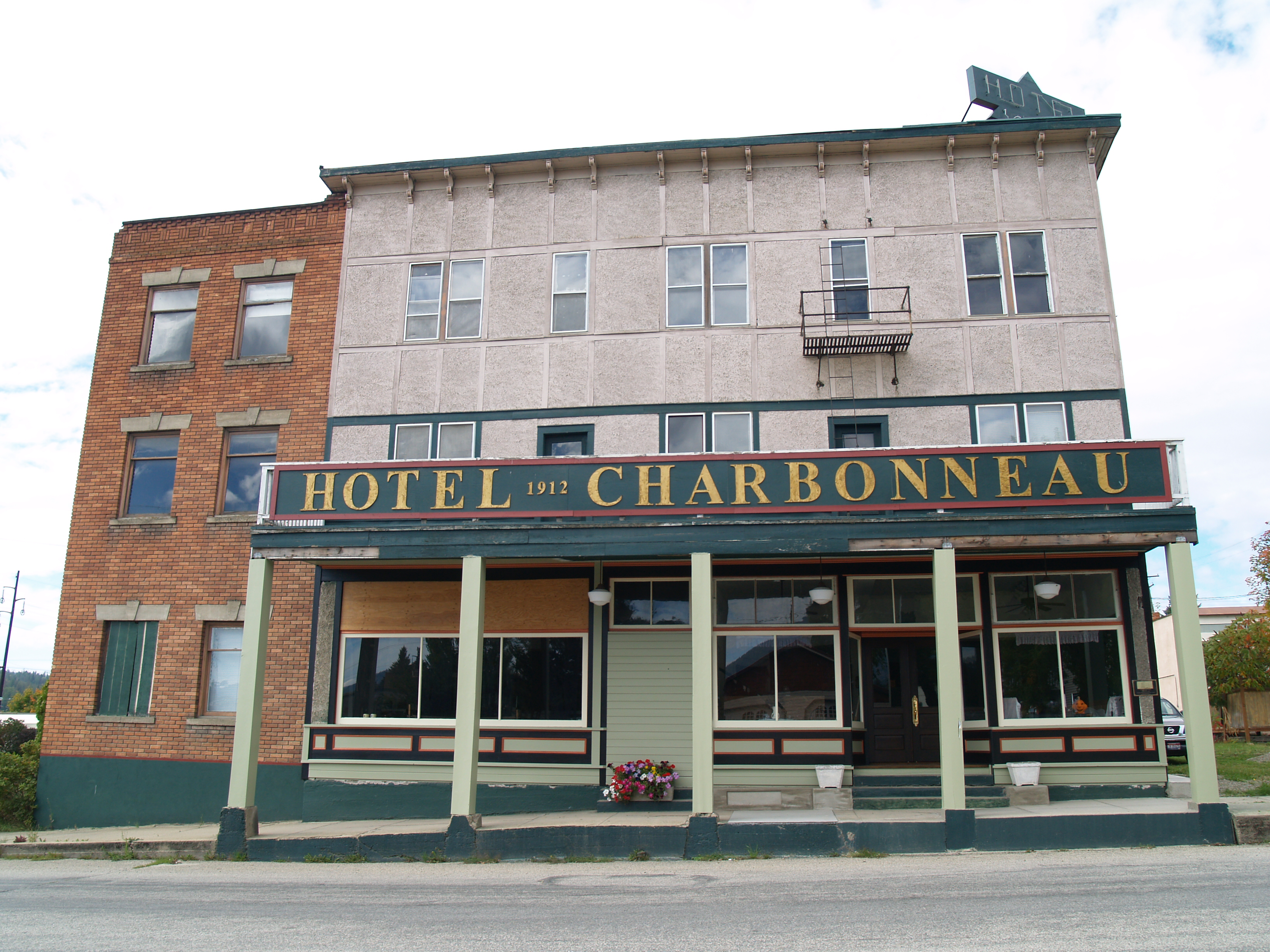

- Location within Idaho Location within the United States
- Location: 88 Wisconsin Street; Priest River, Idaho
- Coordinates: 48°10′45″N 116°54′32″W
- Area: less than one acre
- Built: 1912; 1920
- Built by: Charbonneau, Charles (original hotel); Young, P.J. (hotel addition, 1920)
- NRHP reference No.: 91001718
- Added to NRHP: November 19, 1991

The Hotel Charbonneau is located at 88 Wisconsin Street (formally 207 Wisconsin Street) in Priest River, Idaho and is listed on the National Register of Historic Places. It was originally constructed in 1912 by Charles and Dora Charbonneau (architects PJ Young and Charles Charbonneau). During the first half of the 20th century, Priest River and the Hotel Charbonneau, which is located one block away from where the train station used to be, was a popular stopping-off point for people traveling to nearby Spokane, Coeur d'Alene, Sandpoint, and Priest Lake. In 1920, Dora Charbonneau added a brick addition onto the south side of the hotel to accommodate more guests. After the brick addition was built, the Hotel Charbonneau boasted 27 guest rooms with more than half of them having their own private bathrooms; an extravagant luxury at that time.

== History ==
It was purchased by Bob and Lorraine Shaffer in the mid-1940s and then renamed to be the Lorraine Hotel.

The Charbonneau operated as a hotel/boarding house until the late 1980s when it was abandoned and risked being condemned. In 1991 the Priest River Restoration and Revitalization Committee (PRRRC), a local non-profit group composed entirely of volunteers, took control of the Hotel Charbonneau and saved it from complete deterioration. Among the PRRRC's accomplishments was having the Hotel Charbonneau added to the National Register of Historic Places (11/19/91), which was hoped to protect the historic structure for future generations. The hotel was purchased by the PRRRC for $50,000; the group hoped to rehab it to serve as a combination bed-and-breakfast and apartments for senior citizens.

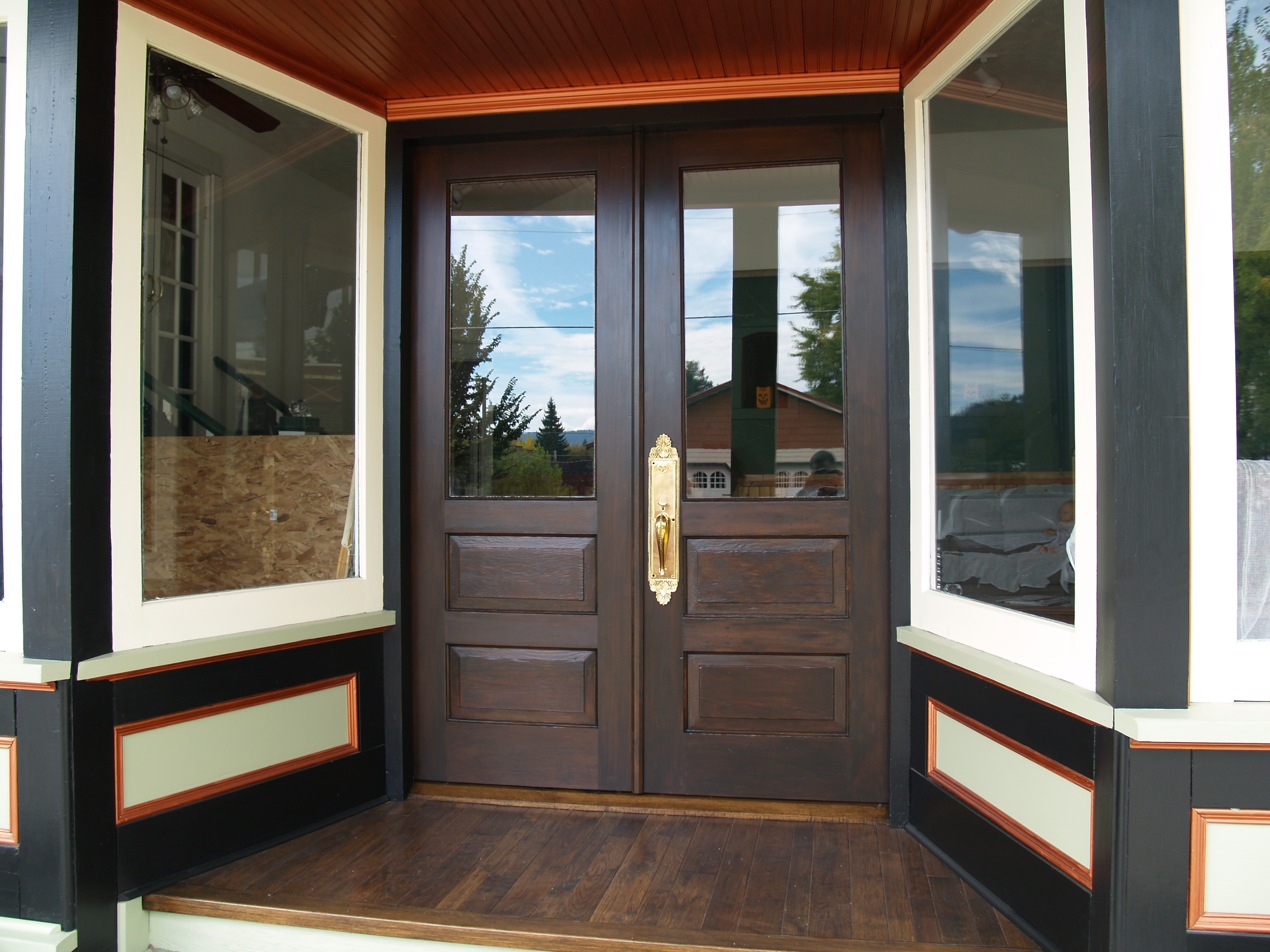
Restored front entrance

In 2010 the Hotel Charbonneau was privately owned and undergoing restoration.

According to its website, in 2017 the hotel is under renovation and is not open.

The three-story building has an irregular U-shaped plan. The original L-shaped building of 1912 was expanded by three-story addition on the south side making the U shape.
