= Federal building =

Building housing federal governmental agencies

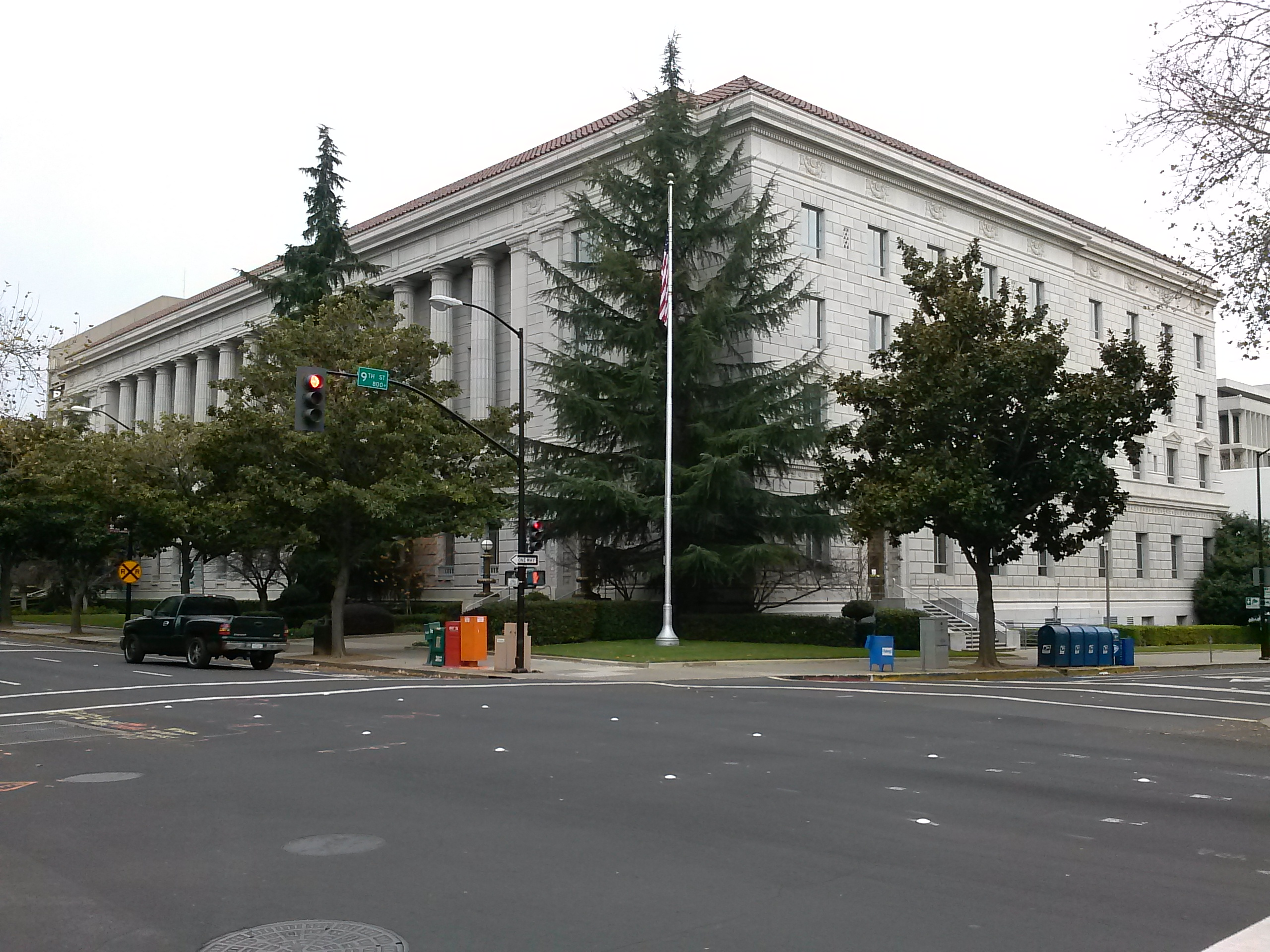
The Federal Building of Sacramento, California

A federal building is a building housing local offices of various government departments and agencies in countries with a federal system, especially when the central government is referred to as the "federal government".

Federal buildings in the United States often include passport offices, immigration services and FBI field offices.

== Canada ==
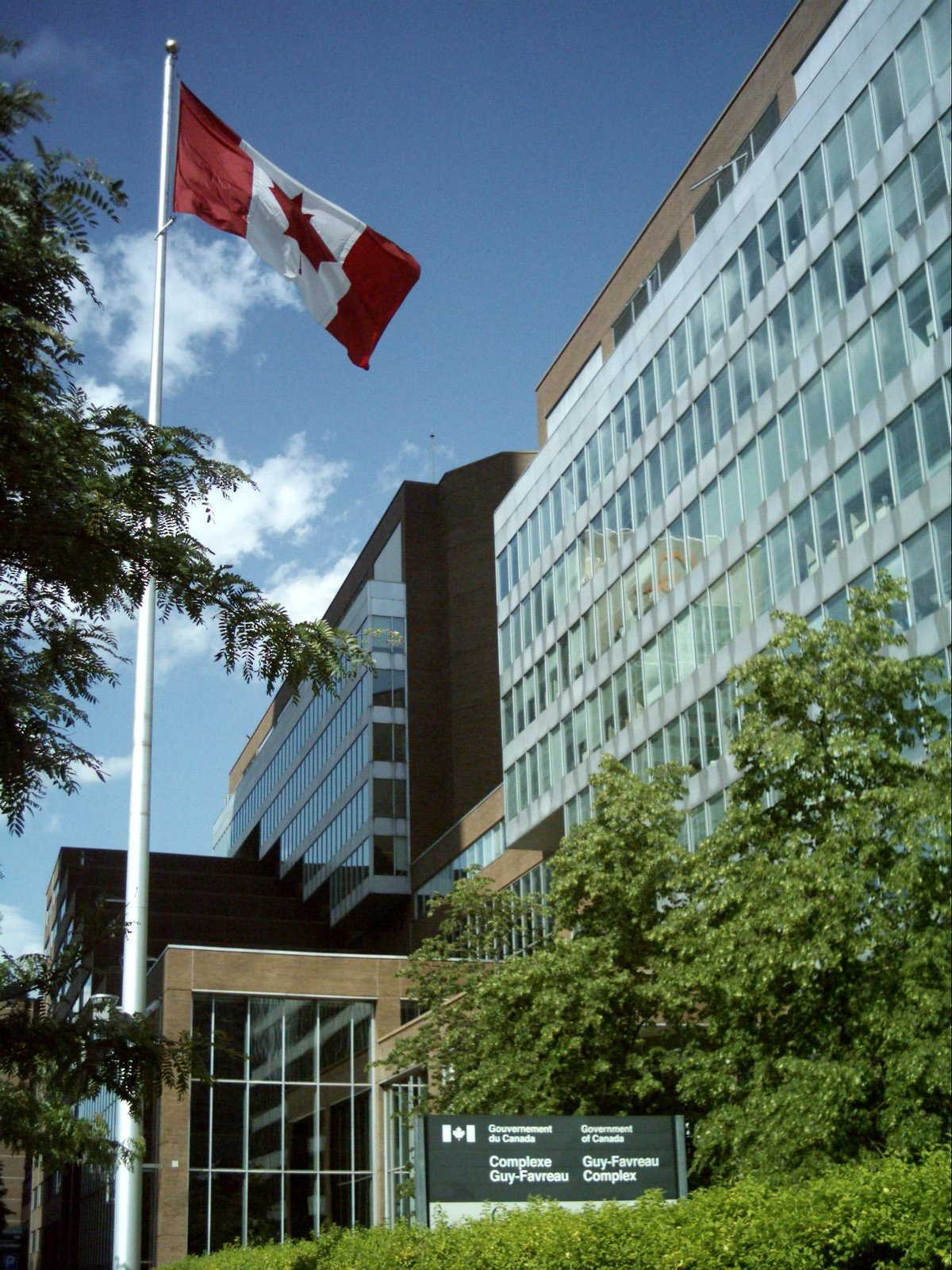
Complexe Guy-Favreau, Montréal, Québec

Notable Federal buildings in Canada include:

- Complexe Guy-Favreau, Montréal
- Dominion Public Building, Halifax
- Federal Building, Edmonton
- Government of Canada Building, Moncton
- Government of Canada Building, North York
