= Lakedance International Film Festival =

Founded in 2006, and operating until 2009, the Lakedance International Film Festival was held annually in Sandpoint, Idaho in autumn, featuring an international juried competition of feature and short length independent films, question and answer sessions with filmmakers and stars, panel discussions, gala events, outdoor screenings, educational opportunities and VIP exclusive events.

== History ==
=== 2006 Foundation ===
In January 2006, father and son Fred and Trevor Greenfield announced the formation of the first international film festival in North Idaho, to be held in Sandpoint, Idaho at The Historic Panida Theater during the dates of August 24–26, 2006 and would be named the "Idaho Panhandle International Film Festival" (later changed to "Lakedance" and its various iterations).

The Greenfields said their motivation for creating their event was to avoid "Hollywood politics" and "star-driven marketing" and focus on just high quality entertaining independent films and their producers, directors, crew, and stars, and their mission was to find these films and give them exposure.

Laughing Dog Brewing of Ponderay, Idaho launched their business around the same time and became the first corporate sponsors of the film festival. They were later joined by a number of staple businesses in Bonner County, including Schweitzer Mountain Resort, Horizon Credit Union, Nieman's Floral and Sandpoint Realty.

The winner of the Laughing Dog Brewing Award "Best Comedy" award went to Vinnie Langdon III for his short, Permission.

In August 2006, IPIFF took place, hosting over a thousand attendees, and nearly twenty filmmakers and stars representing their movies.

Notably, in this year, the IPIFF screened and awarded the "Best Soundtrack" Eagle Award to Binta Y La Gran Idea, which was nominated for the 2007 Academy Awards in the Best Live Action Short category, and The Bachelorman, which was later acquired by HD Net and Magnolia Pictures.

=== 2007–2009 ===
In March 2007, the Greenfields announced they were changing the film festival's name from the "Idaho Panhandle International Film Festival" to the "Lakedance International Film Festival" or just "Lakedance" for short, and that the dates of the film festival would be changed from August to September 9–16, 2007.

Later that same year, Lakedance announced the signing of a title sponsor, Schweitzer Mountain Resort, and a modification of their name and logo to read "Schweitzer Lakedance". Also, two new events were added to the film festival: The first ever outdoor screening at Sandpoint's City Beach Park, free to the public, and VIP cruises on Lake Pend Oreille aboard the Shawnodese.

In 2008 Lakedance was held on September 7–14, and featured two more new additions: The formation of the "North Idaho Filmmaker Grant" program, sponsored by Washington Trust Bank, designed to assist talented North Idaho filmmakers by providing additional funding for their next movie to be shot in North Idaho, and original program cover art for their program by renowned Sandpoint artist Lisa VanDerKarr and the formation.

The final Lakedance festival in Sandpoint was staged in 2009, after which the Greenfields left the area to re-launch the Edmonds International Film Festival in Edmonds, Washington, in October 2010. The Edmonds festival was subsequently canceled in 2011.

== See also ==
- Sandpoint, Idaho
