= KPND =

Coordinates: 48.079°N 116.954°W

- Deer Park, Washington; United States
- Broadcast area: Spokane metropolitan area Inland Northwest
- Frequency: 95.3 MHz (HD Radio)
- Branding: 95.3 KPND

Programming
- Format: Adult alternative
- Subchannels: HD2: Rock "Rock 103"

Ownership
- Owner: Blue Sky Broadcasting, Inc.
- Sister stations: KSPT, KIBR, KICR, KBFI, KTPO

History
- First air date: May 19, 1980

Technical information
- Licensing authority: FCC
- Facility ID: 5992
- Class: C
- ERP: 100,000 watts
- HAAT: 572 meters

Links
- Public license information: Public file; LMS
- Webcast: Listen live
- Website: kpndradio.com

KPND (95.3 MHz) is a commercial FM radio station licensed to Deer Park, Washington, and serving the Spokane metropolitan area and the Inland Northwest. It is owned by Blue Sky Broadcasting and it airs an Adult Album Alternative radio format, which it calls "Progressive Radio for the Inland Northwest." KPND shares studios and offices with its sister stations at 327 Marion Avenue in Sandpoint, Idaho.

== FM Signal ==
KPND was originally licensed to Sandpoint, but was allowed to move its city of license into the Spokane radio market in 2008. It increased its effective radiated power (ERP) to 56,000 watts from a tower in the Hoodoo Mountains of Northern Idaho, more than 2500 feet in height above average terrain (HAAT). With a good radio, its signal can be heard in parts of Washington, Idaho, Montana and British Columbia. The new pattern's downside is that it has significant dead spots due to the terrain of North Idaho that the old signal covered. In Spokane, the signal is mostly listenable, with the strongest points being the Northside and the South Hill. Spokane Valley's lower elevation results in significant signal chopping.

In April 2011, KPND began simulcasting on 106.7 KTPO in Kootenai, Idaho. The move alleviates signal issues within Bonner County of KPND due to the rugged terrain. KPND was also heard on translator station K296BJ 107.1 MHz with an ERP of 34 watts, in Bonners Ferry, Idaho, but as of 2022, it now relays KDRK 93.7 in Spokane.

On August 29, 2021, KPND began broadcasting in HD Radio, adding a simulcast of sister station KICR on HD2. On January 27, 2022, the HD2 subchannel was switched to Rock "Rock 103", a simulcast of K275CF 102.9 Sandpoint and KTPO-HD2 Kootenai.

== History ==
On May 19, 1980, the station first signed on. It originally was only powered at 1,000 watts, with a signal that could only be heard in and around Sandpoint. It featured a middle of the road format. KPND was put on the air by the Blue Sky Broadcasting Company, which still owns it to this day.
