= Crazy Eddie (disambiguation) =

Crazy Eddie may refer to:

- Crazy Eddie, a chain of electronics stores
- Crazy Eddie, a mythical alien character in the 1974 novel The Mote in God's Eye
- Crazy Eddie, a fictional character, Eddie Nambulous, from First Wave
- Crazy Eddie Muldoon, a character in Patrick F. McManus's semi-autobiographical books about his childhood
