= KBFI =

Simulcasts KSPT Sandpoint
- Bonners Ferry, Idaho; United States
- Frequency: 1450 kHz
- Branding: Talk Radio 1450

Programming
- Format: News Talk Information
- Affiliations: ABC News Radio; Bloomberg Radio; ESPN Radio; Compass Media Networks; Premiere Networks; Westwood One

Ownership
- Owner: Blue Sky Broadcasting, Inc.
- Sister stations: KSPT, KIBR, KPND

History
- First air date: 1984
- Call sign meaning: K-Bonners Ferry Idaho

Technical information
- Licensing authority: FCC
- Facility ID: 54500
- Class: C
- Power: 1,000 watts unlimited
- Transmitter coordinates: 48°41′20″N 116°20′4″W
- Translator: 97.1 K246CU (Bonners Ferry)

Links
- Public license information: Public file; LMS
- Webcast: Listen Live
- Website: northidahoradio.com

KBFI (1450 AM, "Talk Radio 1450") is a radio station broadcasting a News Talk Information format. Located in Bonners Ferry, Idaho, the station is currently owned by Radio Bonners Ferry, Inc. (Blue Sky Broadcasting, Inc.)

While licensed to Bonner's Ferry and its transmitter site is there, KBFI shares studios and offices with its sister stations at 327 Marion Avenue in Sandpoint, Idaho.
