= KIBR =

- Sandpoint, Idaho; United States
- Broadcast area: Bonner County, Idaho
- Frequency: 102.5 MHz (HD Radio)
- Branding: K102 Country

Programming
- Format: HD1/analog: Country; HD2: Rock "Rock 103"; HD3: Classic country "102.9 Hank FM"
- Affiliations: Compass Media Networks; Westwood One

Ownership
- Owner: Benefield Broadcasting, Inc
- Sister stations: KSPT, KPND, KBFI, KICR, KTPO

History
- Former call signs: KJDE (1988–1995); KSPT (1995–1998)

Technical information
- Licensing authority: FCC
- Facility ID: 36236
- Class: A
- ERP: 430 watts
- HAAT: 368.0 meters (1,207.3 ft)
- Transmitter coordinates: 48°13′45″N 116°30′28″W
- Translators: 102.3 K272AR (Bonners Ferry); 102.9 K275CF (Sandpoint, relays HD3); 103.3 K277CQ (Sandpoint, relays HD2)

Links
- Public license information: Public file; LMS
- Webcast: Listen Live HD1; Listen Live HD2
- Website: k102radio.com HD1; HD2

KIBR (102.5 FM) is a radio station broadcasting a country format. Licensed to Sandpoint, Idaho, United States, the station is currently owned by Benefield Broadcasting, Inc.

== History ==
The station was assigned the call letters KJDE by the FCC on 1988-08-24. On 1995-05-03, the station changed its call sign to KSPT and on 1998-08-17 to the current KIBR.

KIBR shares studios and offices with its sister stations at 327 Marion Avenue in Sandpoint.

Programming is also heard in Bonners Ferry, Idaho on 102.3 K272AR, operating with 34 watts of power.
