= Bob Kennedy (American football, born 1921) =

American football player (1921–2010)

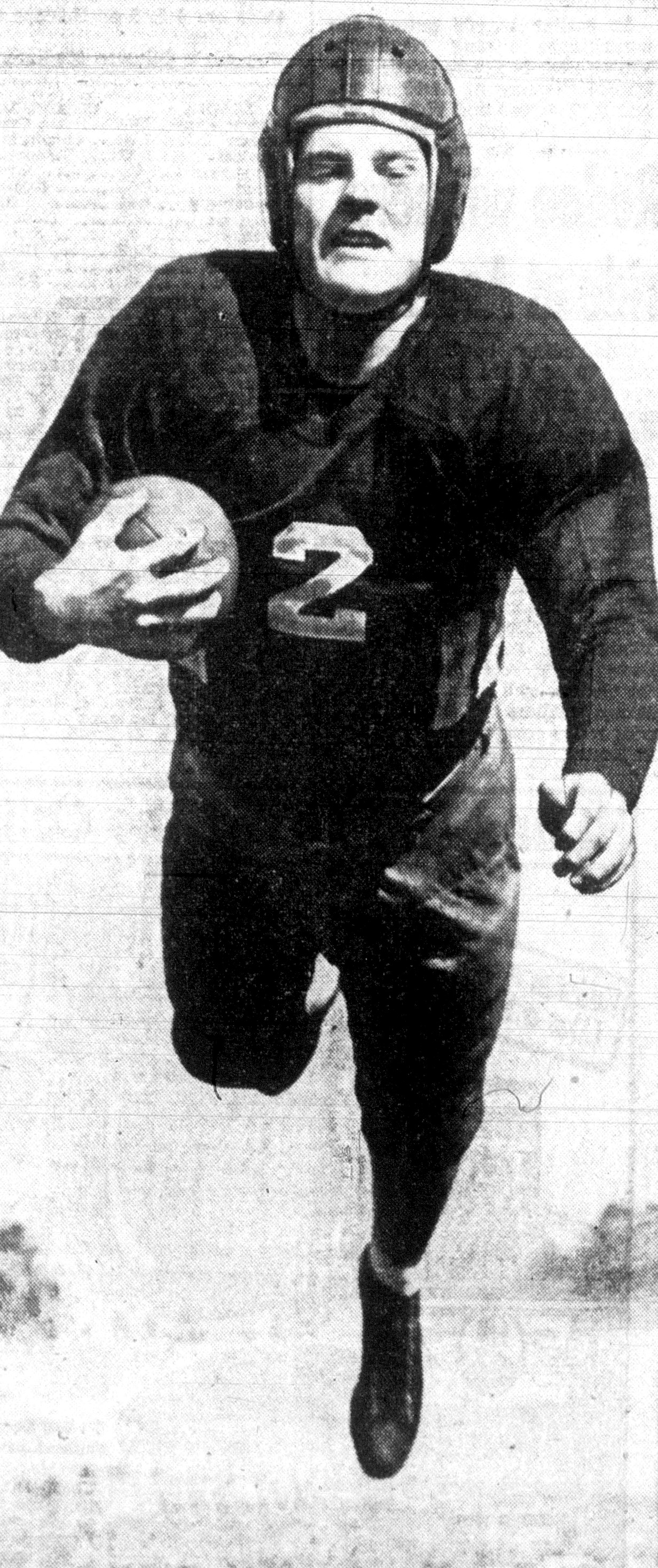
- Kennedy, circa 1942

No. 85
- Positions: Running back, defensive back

Personal information
- Born: June 29, 1921; Sandpoint, Idaho, U.S.
- Died: July 29, 2010 (aged 89); Boise, Idaho, U.S.
- Listed height: 5 ft 11 in (1.80 m)
- Listed weight: 195 lb (88 kg)

Career information
- High school: Sandpoint
- College: Washington State
- NFL draft: 1943: 4th round, 27th overall pick

Career history
- New York Yankees (1946–1949); New York Yanks (1950)

Awards and highlights
- First-team All-American (1942); First-team All-PCC (1942); Second-team All-PCC (1941)
- Military career
- Allegiance: United States
- Branch: U.S. Army Air Forces
- Rank: Lieutenant
- Conflicts: World War II
- Stats at Pro Football Reference

Robert Henry Kennedy (June 29, 1921 – July 29, 2010) was an American professional football player who was a running back for five seasons with the New York Yankees of the All-America Football Conference (AAFC) and the New York Yanks of the National Football League (NFL).

== Football career ==
After graduation from Sandpoint High School in northern Idaho, Kennedy attended Washington State College in Pullman and played college football for the Cougars; he was an All-American fullback and quarterback. He continued to play football for the U.S. Army Air Forces during the years of World War II, with the Third Air Force Gremlins.

Although selected by the Philadelphia Eagles in the fourth round of the 1943 NFL draft, after the war Kennedy signed a contract to play for the upstart New York Yankees of the AAFC, a new professional league established in competition with the established NFL. Kennedy played "both ways" for the Yankees, starting as a running back on offense and a linebacker and defensive back on defense.

In 1950, following the merger of the AAFC and the NFL, Kennedy played one season for the short-lived New York Yanks of the NFL.

== After football ==
During his later years, Kennedy worked as a real estate broker and a property developer in southern California; he was a proficient chef and an aficionado of playing cards.

He was inducted into the WSU athletic hall of fame in 1988.
