= Bonners Ferry, Idaho =

City in Idaho

Bonners Ferry
- City
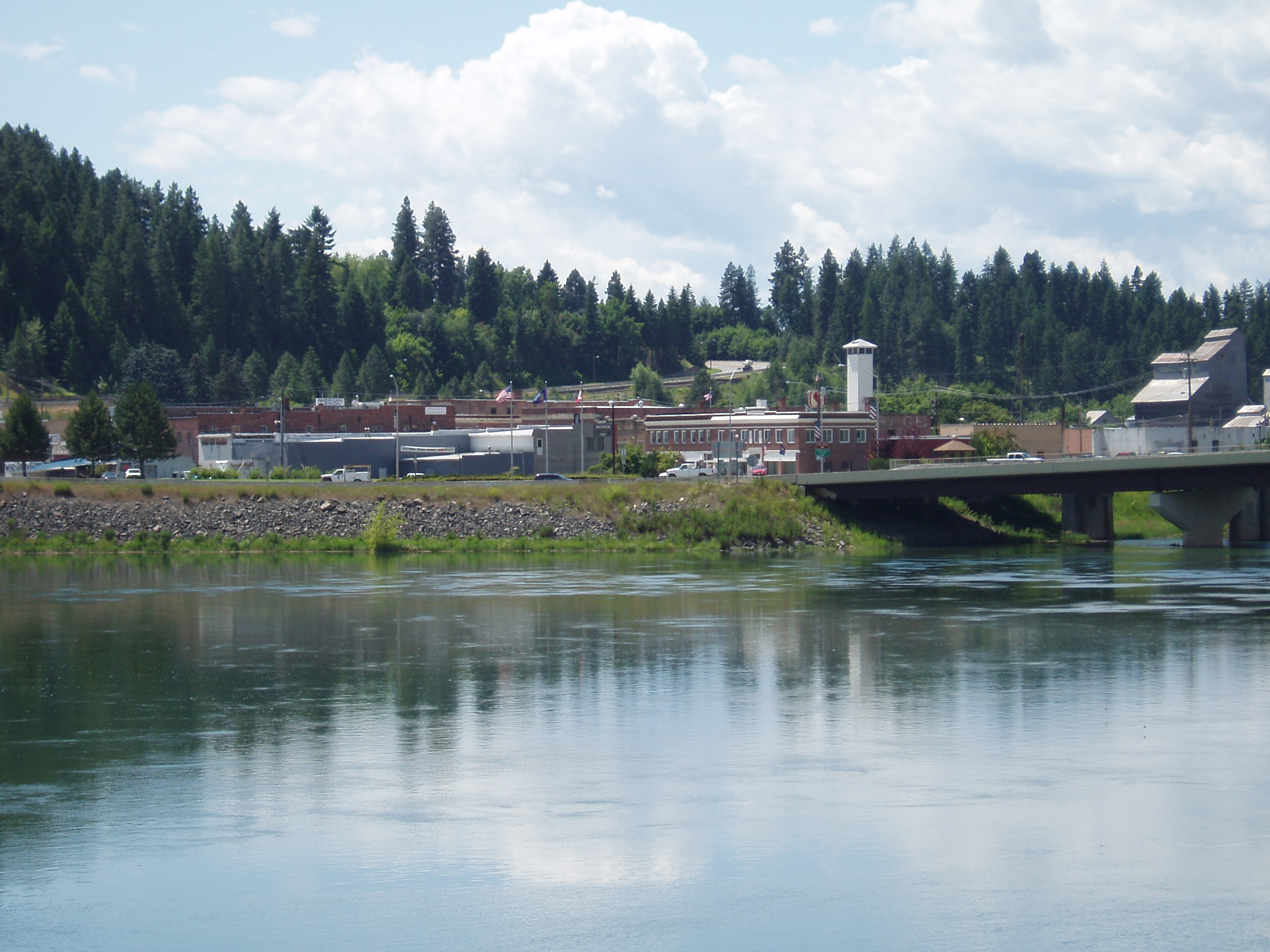
- Bonners Ferry and the Kootenai River

- Location of Bonners Ferry in Boundary County, Idaho.

- Location in the United States
- Coordinates: 48°41′34″N 116°19′09″W
- Country: United States
- State: Idaho
- County: Boundary

Area
  - Total: 2.51 sq mi (6.50 km^{2})
  - Land: 2.36 sq mi (6.10 km^{2})
  - Water: 0.15 sq mi (0.40 km^{2})
- Elevation: 1,896 ft (578 m)

Population (2020)
  - Total: 2,520
  - Density: 1,070/sq mi (413/km^{2})
- Time zone: UTC-8 (Pacific (PST))
  - Summer (DST): UTC-7 (PDT)
- ZIP code: 83805
- Area codes: 208, 986
- FIPS code: 16-09370
- GNIS feature ID: 2409879
- Website: bonnersferry.id.gov

Bonners Ferry is the largest city in and the county seat of Boundary County, Idaho, United States. The population was 2,520 at the 2020 census.

The Porthill-Rykerts Border Crossing connects Bonners Ferry with Creston, British Columbia, Canada, on the Kootenay River.

The Eastport–Kingsgate Border Crossing connects Bonners Ferry with Yahk, British Columbia, Canada, on the Moyie River.

== History ==
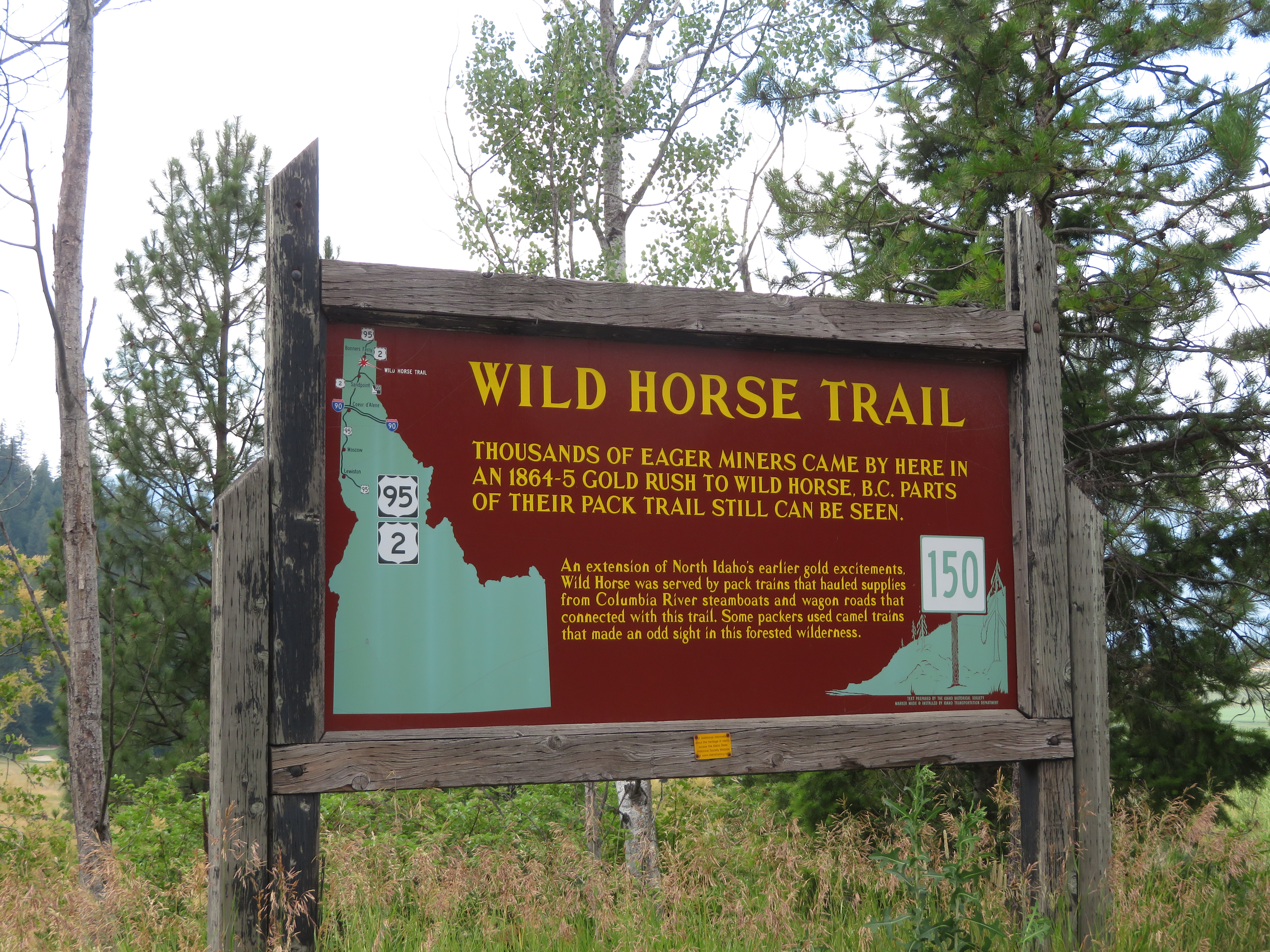
Idaho State Historical Marker No. 150 marking the Wild Horse Trail utilized by prospector pack trains

When gold was discovered in the East Kootenays of British Columbia in 1863, thousands of prospectors from all over the West surged northward over a route that became known as the Wildhorse Trail. Edwin Bonner, a merchant from Walla Walla, Washington, established a ferry in 1864 where the trail crossed the broad Kootenai River. In 1875, Richard Fry, and his Sinixt wife, Justine Su-steel Fry, leased the business, but the location retained the name of the original founder and later became the town of Bonners Ferry.

Before the gold rush, only a few visitors had come to the region; one of the first was explorer David Thompson, a cartographer for the North West Company. Thompson and four fellow fur traders arrived in 1808 to trade with the Lower Kootenais. The local natives gave Thompson's party dried fish and moss bread. Thompson returned the next year and established a trading post on Lake Pend Oreille. He was followed in 1846 by Jesuit Priest Father DeSmet, a missionary to the Kootenai Tribe.

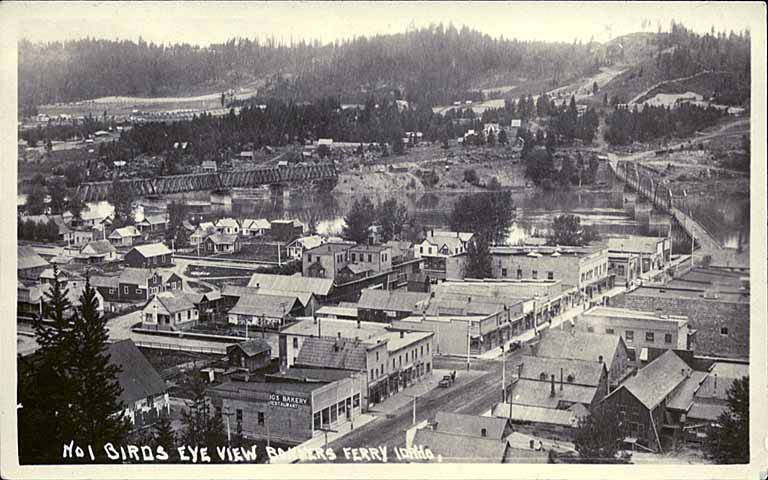
Bonners Ferry ca. 1915

The Oregon Question was settled by the Oregon Treaty of 1846 which established the 49th Parallel north as the boundary between the US and British North America. Government surveyors of the Boundary Commission came in 1858 to establish the border between the United States and British Columbia.

Bonners Ferry in the 1880s flourished due to the mines in the north. Entering service in 1883 the Norwegian-built steamer Midge transported passengers and freight between Bonners Ferry and British Columbia for 25 years. In 1892 The Great Northern Railway was built, followed by the Spokane International and the Kootenai Valley lines.

The village of Bonners Ferry was formally established in 1893, along the south bank of the Kootenai River. Scattered along the valley and benchland were a few ranches and homesteads. Numerous mines were developed in the nearby mountains, including the Continental Mine in the Selkirks. The lumber industry also grew rapidly. Bonners Ferry, perched on stilts to avoid the inevitable spring floods, appeared to be a boom town.

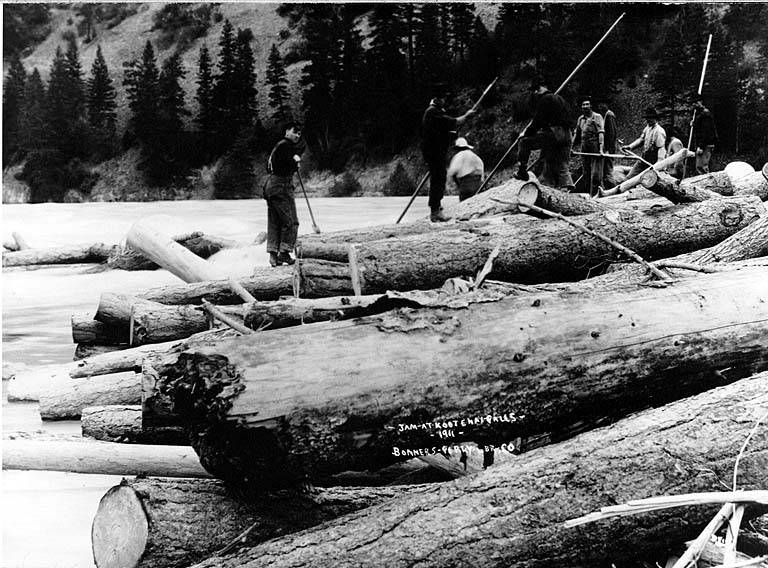
Bonners Ferry Lumber Co. workers working on a log jam upriver on the Kootenay, 1911.

Moving into the 20th century, the town became the center of a lumbering and farming community. The valley land was drained, levees were constructed and farms were cleared on the benches. The rich Kootenai Valley became known as the "Nile of the North," while the Bonners Ferry Lumber Company grew to be one of the world's largest lumber mills. The downtown took shape as brick buildings were constructed, replacing those on stilts. Completion of the Libby Dam in 1975 lessened the threat of serious flooding. Today, much of Main Street dates from this initial period of solid, permanent construction.

On September 20, 1974, the Kootenai Tribe, headed by chairwoman Amy Trice, declared war on the United States government. Their first act was to post soldiers on each end of the highway that runs through the town who would ask people to pay a toll to drive through what had been the tribe's aboriginal land. The money would be used to house and care for elderly tribal members. Most tribes in the United States are forbidden to declare war on the U.S. government because of treaties, but the Kootenai Tribe never signed a treaty. The dispute resulted in the concession by the United States government and a land grant of 10.5 acres (42,000 m^{2}) that is now the Kootenai Reservation.

Bonners Ferry is 8 miles (13 km) from the site of the Ruby Ridge standoff in 1992, which occurred just outside Naples, Idaho.

In 2025, critically-acclaimed American period film Train Dreams was set in Bonners Ferry. Depicting the life and hardships of Pacific Northwest loggers in the early 20th century.

== Geography and climate ==
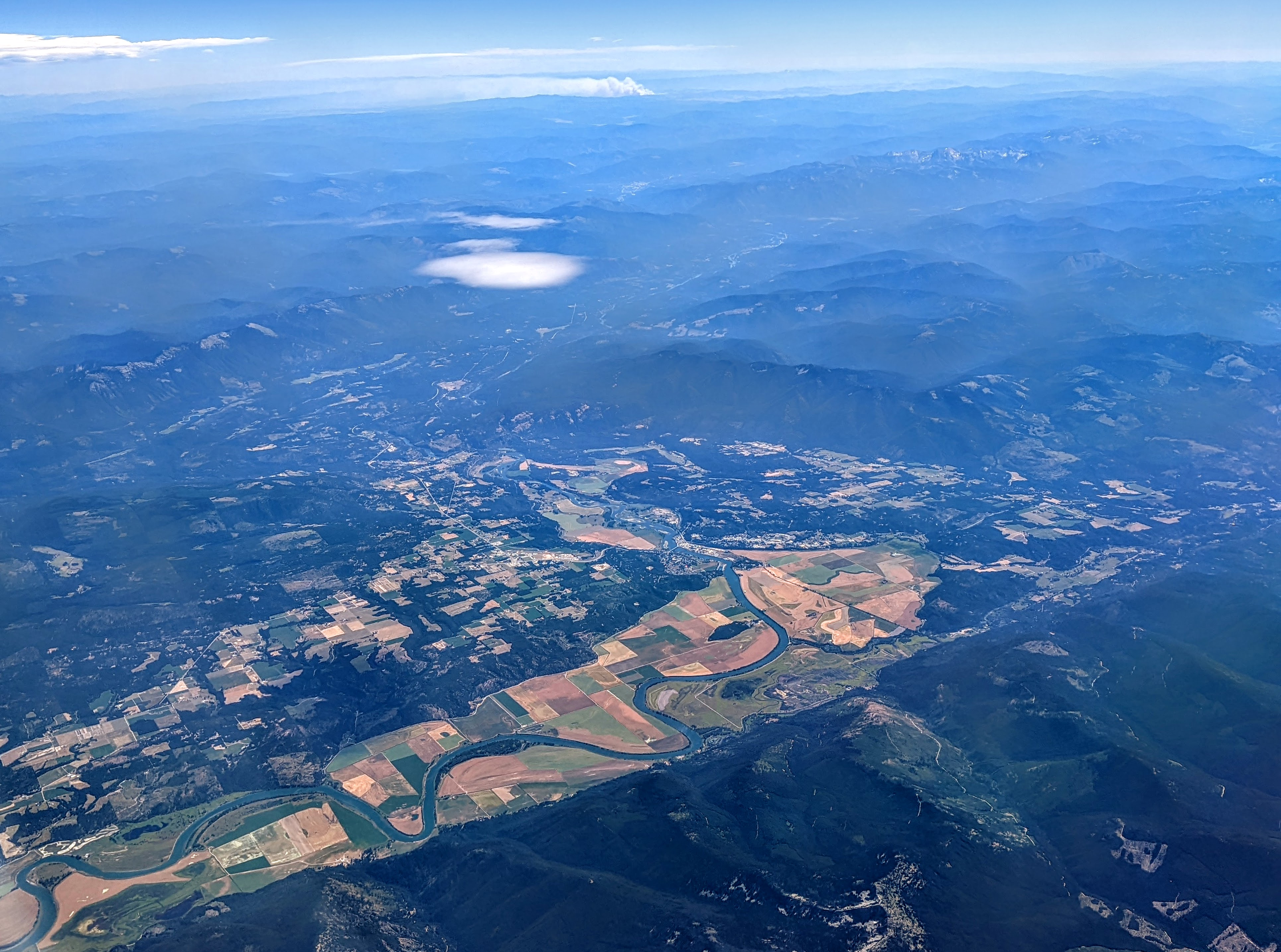
Aerial view of the valley of the Kootenay River, with Bonners Ferry, Idaho; smoke plume of the 2022 Elmo Fire in the background

Bonners Ferry is located 27 miles (43 km) south of the Canada-United States border. According to the United States Census Bureau, the city has a total area of 2.61 square miles (6.76 km^{2}), of which 2.44 square miles (6.32 km^{2}) is land and 0.17 square miles (0.44 km^{2}) is water.

Bonners Ferry has a humid continental climate (Köppen Dfb/Dsb) with cold, snowy winters and dry summers with hot days and cool nights. It is almost warm enough to be classed as a Mediterranean climate or oceanic climate, although snow depths above 10 inches (0.25 m) occur on 23.6 days on average.

Climate data for Bonners Ferry, Idaho, 1991–2020 normals, extremes 1907–present
Month	Jan	Feb	Mar	Apr	May	Jun	Jul	Aug	Sep	Oct	Nov	Dec	Year
Record high °F (°C)	55 (13)	63 (17)	75 (24)	89 (32)	95 (35)	108 (42)	107 (42)	105 (41)	98 (37)	84 (29)	67 (19)	59 (15)	108 (42)
Mean maximum °F (°C)	45.7 (7.6)	50.1 (10.1)	62.0 (16.7)	74.3 (23.5)	83.1 (28.4)	89.8 (32.1)	96.0 (35.6)	96.3 (35.7)	86.7 (30.4)	71.5 (21.9)	54.8 (12.7)	46.4 (8.0)	97.5 (36.4)
Mean daily maximum °F (°C)	33.7 (0.9)	38.6 (3.7)	48.4 (9.1)	59.2 (15.1)	69.4 (20.8)	74.6 (23.7)	84.8 (29.3)	84.7 (29.3)	73.3 (22.9)	56.3 (13.5)	41.5 (5.3)	33.1 (0.6)	58.1 (14.5)
Daily mean °F (°C)	28.7 (−1.8)	31.6 (−0.2)	39.0 (3.9)	47.3 (8.5)	56.3 (13.5)	61.9 (16.6)	69.0 (20.6)	68.3 (20.2)	58.9 (14.9)	45.9 (7.7)	35.6 (2.0)	28.5 (−1.9)	47.6 (8.7)
Mean daily minimum °F (°C)	23.7 (−4.6)	24.6 (−4.1)	29.7 (−1.3)	35.5 (1.9)	43.1 (6.2)	49.2 (9.6)	53.2 (11.8)	52.0 (11.1)	44.5 (6.9)	35.6 (2.0)	29.7 (−1.3)	23.8 (−4.6)	37.1 (2.8)
Mean minimum °F (°C)	3.4 (−15.9)	8.3 (−13.2)	16.5 (−8.6)	25.7 (−3.5)	30.8 (−0.7)	37.8 (3.2)	42.9 (6.1)	42.2 (5.7)	32.4 (0.2)	21.8 (−5.7)	13.8 (−10.1)	7.5 (−13.6)	−2.2 (−19.0)
Record low °F (°C)	−29 (−34)	−25 (−32)	−12 (−24)	12 (−11)	17 (−8)	23 (−5)	32 (0)	28 (−2)	15 (−9)	8 (−13)	−13 (−25)	−33 (−36)	−33 (−36)
Average precipitation inches (mm)	2.63 (67)	1.83 (46)	2.01 (51)	1.26 (32)	1.78 (45)	1.92 (49)	0.64 (16)	0.53 (13)	1.02 (26)	1.73 (44)	2.55 (65)	3.17 (81)	21.07 (535)
Average snowfall inches (cm)	15.0 (38)	10.8 (27)	3.7 (9.4)	0.4 (1.0)	0.0 (0.0)	0.0 (0.0)	0.0 (0.0)	0.0 (0.0)	0.0 (0.0)	0.2 (0.51)	6.4 (16)	17.3 (44)	53.8 (135.91)
Average extreme snow depth inches (cm)	15.2 (39)	10.8 (27)	6.0 (15)	0.3 (0.76)	0.0 (0.0)	0.0 (0.0)	0.0 (0.0)	0.0 (0.0)	0.0 (0.0)	0.0 (0.0)	3.8 (9.7)	11.3 (29)	20.9 (53)
Average precipitation days (≥ 0.01 in)	12.9	8.5	10.7	9.4	9.7	10.2	5.6	4.3	6.7	10.1	13.0	12.9	114.0
Average snowy days (≥ 0.1 in)	7.8	3.8	1.9	0.3	0.0	0.0	0.0	0.0	0.0	0.1	2.9	8.4	25.2
Source 1: NOAA
Source 2: National Weather Service

== Demographics ==
Historical population
Census	Pop.	Note	%±
1900	349		—
1910	1,071		206.9%
1920	1,236		15.4%
1930	1,418		14.7%
1940	1,345		−5.1%
1950	1,776		32.0%
1960	1,921		8.2%
1970	1,909		−0.6%
1980	1,906		−0.2%
1990	2,193		15.1%
2000	2,515		14.7%
2010	2,543		1.1%
2020	2,520		−0.9%
U.S. Decennial Census

=== 2020 census ===
As of the 2020 census, Bonners Ferry had a population of 2,520. The median age was 47.6 years. 21.5% of residents were under the age of 18 and 26.5% of residents were 65 years of age or older. For every 100 females there were 91.9 males, and for every 100 females age 18 and over there were 87.6 males age 18 and over.

0.0% of residents lived in urban areas, while 100.0% lived in rural areas.

There were 1,088 households in Bonners Ferry, of which 26.9% had children under the age of 18 living in them. Of all households, 44.5% were married-couple households, 21.7% were households with a male householder and no spouse or partner present, and 28.4% were households with a female householder and no spouse or partner present. About 34.9% of all households were made up of individuals and 19.1% had someone living alone who was 65 years of age or older.

There were 1,188 housing units, of which 8.4% were vacant. The homeowner vacancy rate was 2.5% and the rental vacancy rate was 5.2%.

Racial composition as of the 2020 census
Race	Number	Percent
White	2,280	90.5%
Black or African American	10	0.4%
American Indian and Alaska Native	26	1.0%
Asian	9	0.4%
Native Hawaiian and Other Pacific Islander	3	0.1%
Some other race	37	1.5%
Two or more races	155	6.2%
Hispanic or Latino (of any race)	125	5.0%

=== 2010 census ===
As of the census of 2010, there were 2,543 people, 1,117 households, and 631 families residing in the city. The population density was 1,042.2 inhabitants per square mile (402.4/km^{2}). There were 1,254 housing units at an average density of 513.9 per square mile (198.4/km^{2}). The racial makeup of the city was 94.3 percent White, 0.2 percent African American, 2.0 percent Native American, 0.6 percent Asian, 0.2 percent Pacific Islander, 0.5 percent from other races, and 2.2 percent from 2 or more races. Hispanic or Latino of any race were 4.7 percent of the population.

There were 1,117 households, of which 27.6 percent had children under the age of 18 living with them, 39.1 percent were married couples living together, 12.5 percent had a female householder with no husband present, 4.8 percent had a male householder with no wife present, and 43.5 percent were non-families. 38.6 percent of all households were made up of individuals, and 20% had someone living alone who was 65 years of age or older. The average household size was 2.22 and the average family size was 2.91.

The median age in the city was 41.9 years. 23.7 percent of residents were under the age of 18; 7.5 percent were between the ages of 18 and 24; 21.9 percent were from 25 to 44; 27.4 percent were from 45 to 64; and 19.5 percent were 65 years of age or older. The gender makeup of the city was 48.0 percent male and 52.0 percent female.

=== 2000 census ===
As of the census of 2000, there were 2,515 people, 1,027 households, and 650 families residing in the city. The population density was 1,186.9 inhabitants per square mile (458.3/km^{2}). There were 1,120 housing units at an average density of 528.5 per square mile (204.1/km^{2}). The racial makeup of the city was 95.67 percent White, 0.04 percent African American, 1.59 percent Native American, 0.52 percent Asian, 1.31 percent from other races, and 0.87 percent from 2 or more races. Hispanic or Latino of any race were 4.29 percent of the population.

There were 1,027 households, out of which 31.7 percent had children under the age of 18 living with them, 48.0 percent were married couples living together, 11.2 percent had a female householder with no husband present, and 36.7 percent were non-families. 32.9 percent of all households were made up of individuals, and 15.5 percent had someone living alone who was 65 years of age or older. The average household size was 2.37 and the average family size was 3.00.

In the city, the population was spread out, with 26.9 percent under the age of 18, 8.2 percent from 18 to 24, 24.5 percent from 25 to 44, 21.3 percent from 45 to 64, and 19.1 percent who were 65 years of age or older. The median age was 39 years. For every 100 females, there were 92.7 males. For every 100 females age 18 and over, there were 86.8 males.

The median income for a household in the city was $24,509, and the median income for a family was $35,237. Males had a median income of $28,558 versus $16,776 for females. The per capita income for the city was $13,343. About 17.3 percent of families and 20.0 percent of the population were below the poverty line, including 28.6 percent of those under age 18 and 10.9 percent of those age 65 or over.

== Politics ==
Presidential elections results

Previous presidential elections results
Year	Republican	Democratic	Third parties
2020	74.7% 970	22.9% 297	2.4% 31
2016	71.7% 790	19.6% 216	8.7% 96

Statewide elections results

Previous statewide elections results
Year	Republican	Democratic	Third parties
2020 Senate	73.6% 952	23% 298	3.3% 43
2018 Governor	69.9% 631	28.3% 255	1.8% 17
2018 Lt. Governor	71.5% 636	28.5% 254	0% 0
2018 Attorney General	73.3% 645	26.7% 235	0% 0
2016 Senate	75.1% 825	20.2% 221	4.7% 52

== Transportation ==
Boundary County Airport is a county-owned, public-use airport located 2 nautical miles (3.7 km) northeast of the central business district of Bonners Ferry.

The railroad reached town in 1892; the then Great Northern Railroad as part of its transcontinental line over Maria's Pass, now BNSF. The Kootenai Valley Railway existed 1898-1915. In 1910 a second railroad was built through Bonners Ferry: Spokane International Railroad connecting the US to Canada, now Union Pacific.

While Amtrak's Empire Builder runs through town, the nearest station is at Sandpoint (the only Amtrak station in Idaho).

== Local media ==
Bonners Ferry has been home to KBFI AM 1450 since 1983. It is owned by local licensee Radio Bonners Ferry, Inc, owned by Blue Sky Broadcasting, Inc. While licensed to Bonners Ferry and having its transmitter site located there, KBFI shares studios and offices with its sister stations (KSPT, KIBR, and KPND), in nearby Sandpoint, Idaho.

KSBF 88.9 FM began broadcasting in 2024. Owned and operated by Bonners Ferry Baptist Church, it is an affiliate of the Fundamental Broadcasting Network.

A prominent newspaper in Bonners Ferry is the weekly Bonners Ferry Herald, owned by Hagadone Publishing.

== Sports ==
Bonners Ferry High School has physical education programs such as wrestling, football, baseball, soccer, cheer, dance, golf, and basketball.

There are teams fielded for Little league baseball, in association with nearby Sandpoint, Idaho.

== Education ==
There is one school district in Boundary County: Boundary County School District 101.

Boundary County is in the catchment area, but not the taxation zone, for North Idaho College.

== Other languages ==
Some of the Kootenai Tribe of Idaho speak the city name of their language as Bonners Ferry (Ktunaxa: k̓akanmituk ʔa·kaq̓ǂaʔhaǂ, ʔaq̓anqmi).

== Notable people ==
- Christopher John Boyce, American spy
- Claire Du Brey, silent film actress
- Johnny James, baseball player
- Denis Johnson, author, journalist
- Rita La Roy, silent film actress
