= List of killings by law enforcement officers in the United States, February 2011 =

This is a list of people reported killed by non-military law enforcement officers in the United States in February 2011, whether in the line of duty or not, and regardless of reason or method. The listing documents the occurrence of a death, making no implications regarding wrongdoing or justification on the part of the person killed or officer involved. Killings are arranged by date of the incident that caused death. Different death dates, if known, are noted in the description. The table below lists 22 people.

== February 2011 ==
Date	Name (Age) of Deceased	State (city)	Description
2011-02-28	Martinez, Alejandro P	Washington (Lynden)	Shot after striking deputy in head with a hammer. Officers were responding to a report of a man with mental health issues damaging a home.
2011-02-25	Lyons, Robert	Illinois (Glenwood)	US Army, Retired, killed by a police sniper’s bullet following an eight-hour standoff. Lyons and his wife repeatedly refused to leave the home "for fear that they would both be hurt by the police".
2011-02-24	Elmore, Danny	Colorado (Pueblo)	Shot after answering door with gun in hand and pointing it at officer. Police were responding to report of a loud disturbance at Elmore's home.
2011-02-19	Amos, Shelley; Blount-Burton, Cheryl	Georgia (Avondale Estates)	Died from injuries sustained during motor vehicle accident. Police officer was estimated to be driving at twice the speed limit while not on an emergency call when she collided with another vehicle. The officer was later indicted on two counts of vehicular homicide and reckless driving.
2011-02-17	Wilson, Jason (29)	Florida (New Port Richey)	
2011-02-14	Montgomery Jr., Chastain	Tennessee (Mason)	Shot after firing on police with two pistols. Police were pursuing Montgomery in relation to a carjacking in Nashville.
2011-02-14	Moran-Hernandez, Carolyn	Washington (Lakewood)	Shot after raising gun at officers. Police were responding to a report of domestic violence. Moran told the police "shoot me, shoot me" then raised what turned out to be a BB pistol that looked like a handgun.
2011-02-14	Nelson, Jacob (22)	Florida (Orlando)	
2011-02-14	Pryor, Charles (24)	Florida (Orlando)	
2011-02-12	Morrow, Michael (66)	Florida (Hollywood)	
2011-02-11	Blake, Barion (30)	Florida (Jacksonville)	
2011-02-10	Arreola, Richard	Colorado (Aurora)	Shot while walking "with purpose" with handgun and rifle towards undercover police officer. Officer was performing surveillance on Arreola in an undercover police vehicle prior to serving of warrant for drug distribution.
2011-02-10	Dawkins, David Anthony	Georgia (Augusta)	Shot after point a handgun at officer. Police had pulled over Dawkins' vehicle on suspicion of being stolen.
2011-02-10	McNeil, Travis (28)	Florida (Miami)	
2011-02-08	Giddens, Brian Keith	Georgia (Barnesville)	Shot after confronting deputy with a shotgun. Officer was responding to a report of domestic dispute.
2011-02-08	Little, Christine Ann	Idaho (Kootenai)	Shot as passenger in vehicle that was approaching trooper following chase. The driver had rammed a police cruiser during a chase. Their vehicle was stopped for a traffic violation, then fled.
2011-02-08	Johnson, Daniell	Washington (Lakewood)	Shot in vehicle by SWAT team after "seeing movement in the car". Police had stopped Johnson in relation to a report of domestic violence when a shot was fired inside the vehicle. Police report the first shot was self-inflicted. The medical examiner later determined that the fatal shot was fired by the SWAT team.
2011-02-08	Santiago, Julio (33)	Florida (Miami)	
2011-02-04	Horne, Gregory (29)	Florida (Apopka)	
2011-02-02	Williams, Wade (35)	Florida (Holmes)	
2011-02-01	Hilaire, Hedson (33)	Florida (Miramar)	
2011-02-01	Hillaire, Herson (28)	Florida (Miramar)	

== See also ==
- Death in custody § United States
- Henry A. Wallace Police Crime Public Database
- List of cases of police brutality
- List of countries with annual rates and counts for killings by law enforcement officers
- List of law enforcement officers killed in the line of duty in the United States
- List of law enforcement officers convicted for an on-duty killing in the United States
- List of shootings by US immigration agents
- List of police reforms related to the George Floyd protests
- List of unarmed African Americans killed by law enforcement officers in the United States
- Lists of killings by law enforcement officers
- Police brutality in the United States
- Police misconduct § United States
- Police riot § United States
- Police use of deadly force in the United States
