= KSPT =

- Sandpoint, Idaho; United States
- Frequency: 1400 kHz
- Branding: Talk Radio 1400

Programming
- Format: News Talk Information
- Affiliations: ABC News Radio; Bloomberg Radio; ESPN Radio; Compass Media Networks; Premiere Networks; Westwood One

Ownership
- Owner: Blue Sky Broadcasting Inc.
- Sister stations: KIBR, KPND, KBFI

History
- Call sign meaning: K SandPoinT

Technical information
- Licensing authority: FCC
- Facility ID: 5989
- Class: C
- Power: 1,000 watts unlimited
- Transmitter coordinates: 48°18'15.7"N 116°32'35.7"W
- Repeater: 1450 KBFI (Bonners Ferry)

Links
- Public license information: Public file; LMS
- Webcast: Listen Live
- Website: www.northidahoradio.com

KSPT (1400 AM) is a radio station broadcasting a news talk information format, licensed to Sandpoint, Idaho, United States. The station is currently owned by Blue Sky Broadcasting Inc. and features programming from ABC News Radio, Bloomberg Radio, ESPN Radio, Compass Media Networks, Premiere Networks, and Westwood One.

KSPT shares studios and offices with its sister stations at 327 Marion Avenue in Sandpoint.
