= Kootenai Valley Railway =

Railroad from Idaho to the US–Canada border

The Kootenai Valley Railway Company was organized in 1898 to construct a rail line from Bonners Ferry, Idaho northward to the Idaho-British Columbia international boundary (26 miles). It was controlled by a subsidiary of the Great Northern Railway Company (GN), the Kootenay Railway & Navigation Company, until the latter's 1911 dissolution. KVRC was then absorbed into the GN, then formally dissolved in 1915.
