= Nell Kruegel Irion =

American politician

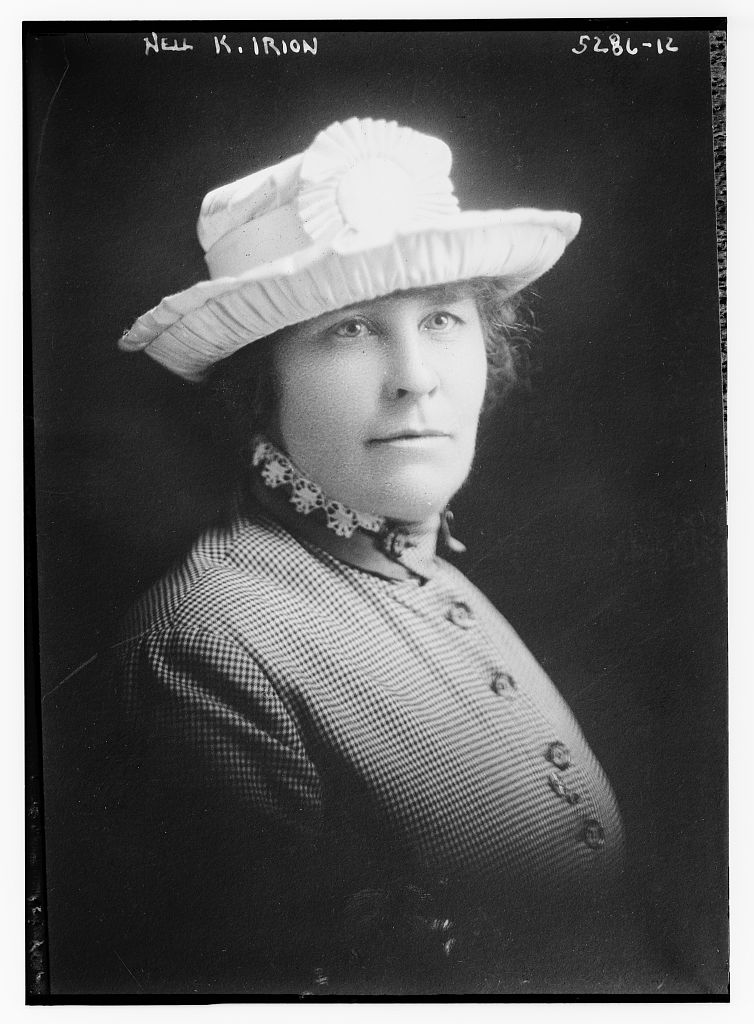

Member of the Sandpoint, Idaho Board of Aldermen
- In office 1936–1937

Personal details
- Born: Nellie Cora Kruegel
- Party: Democratic
- Spouse: Henry Thomas Irion (m. 1902; died 1960)
- Parents: Robert H. Kruegel (father); Amelia Faust (mother)

Nell Cora Kruegel Irion (1877–1964) was an American politician and suffragette who served as superintendent of schools in Bonner County and was the first woman to run for Congress in Idaho.

== Life ==
Irion was born in 1877 to Robert H. Kruegel and Amelia Faust and moved to Sandpoint, Idaho after marrying Henry Thomas Irion in 1902.

In 1910, she was elected as Bonner county's school superintendent. In 1920, she was nominated by the Democratic Party on the first ballot for Idaho's first congressional district, but was defeated in a landslide by incumbent Representative Burton L. French with 34,654 votes to 15,218 votes. In 1936 she was elected to Sandpoint's city council and in 1939 she ran for mayor of Sandpoint, but was defeated by incumbent Mayor Malcolm P. McKinnon by 99 votes.

In the 1940s she served as president of Idaho's affiliate of the General Federation of Women's Clubs. Following her husband's death in 1960 she began to wear male clothing before her own death in 1964 at age 87.
