= Genevieve Pezet =

American-born French artist (1913–2009)

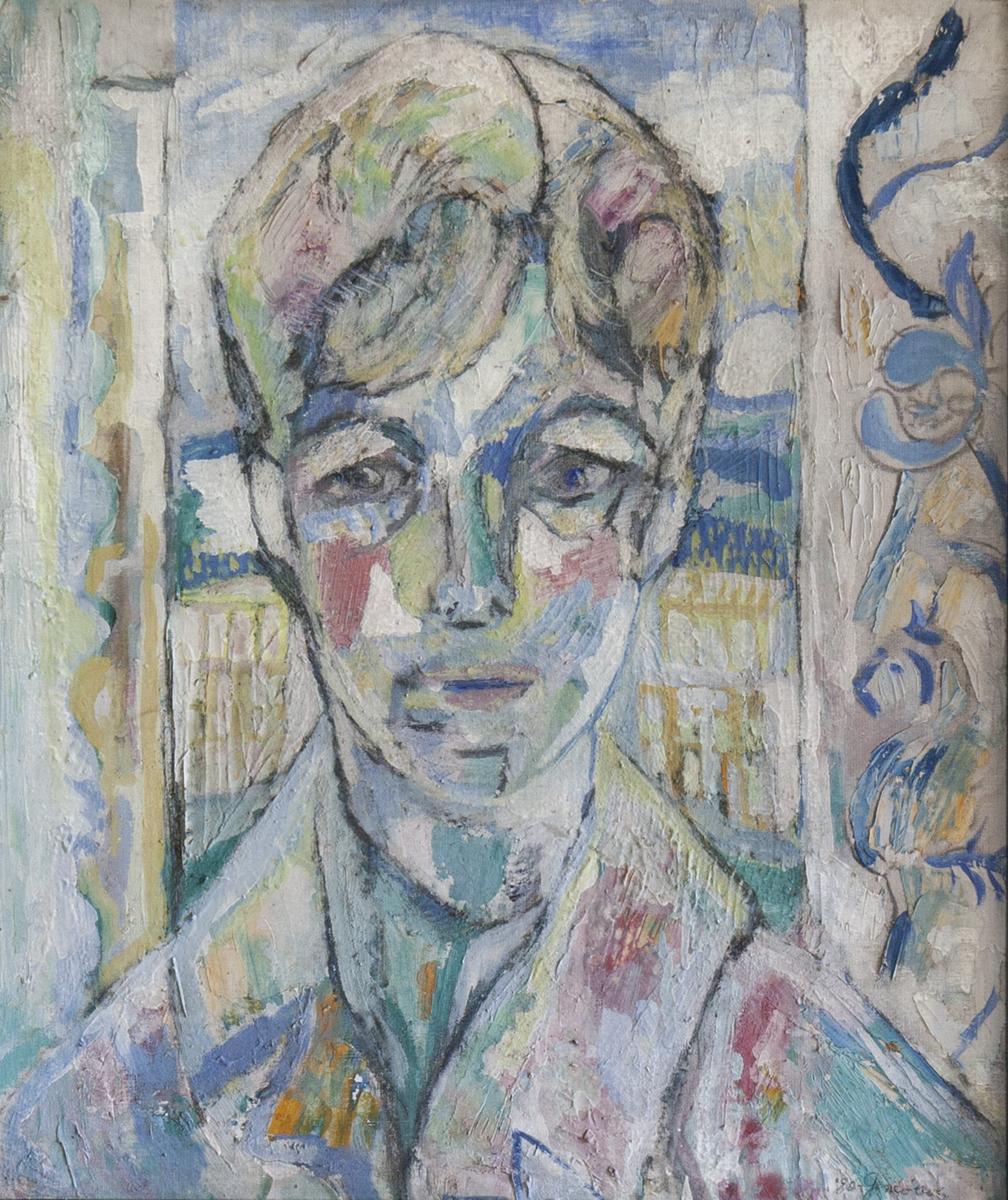
- Self-portrait
- Born: Genevieve Beatrice White; December 19, 1913; Sandpoint, Idaho, US
- Died: January 23, 2009 (aged 95); Pénestin, France
- Known for: painting, sculpture, ceramics

Genevieve Pezet, born as Genevieve Beatrice White, and mononymously signed her work Genevieve (December 19, 1913 – January 23, 2009) was an American-born French artist, known for her paintings, ceramics, and sculptures. She was most active from around the 1940s until 2000.

== Life ==
Genevieve Beatrice White was born December 19, 1913, in Sandpoint, Idaho and she was raised in Troy, Montana. In 1928, she attended Washington State University in Pullman, Washington.

Pezet started painting while studying philosophy at Columbia University. She continued her studies at the Art Students League of New York, while teaching at the New York School of Interior Design. In 1947, she moved to Paris and she studied painting with André Lhote at the André Lhote Academy and sculpture with Ossip Zadkine in 1956 at the Académie de la Grande Chaumière. In 1948, she married Jacques Pezet at the Saint-Sulpice church in Paris. Together they had two sons.

In 1954, she participated in the Salon de la Jeune Sculpture at Musée Rodin.

She died in Pénestin, Morbihan in France, on January 23, 2009.

== Additional reading ==
- Hazan, Fernand (1960). Dictionnaire de la Sculpture Moderne. Paris, France: Hazan.
- Seuphor, Michel (1959). La Sculpture de ce Siècle: Dictionnaire de la Sculpture Moderne [The Sculpture Of This Century: Dictionary Of Modern Sculpture] (in French). Neuchatel, Switzerland: Editions du Griffon. p. 269. ISBN 978-2880068820.
