= Sandpoint High School =

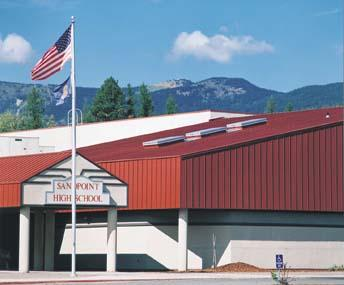

Location
- 410 S. Division Ave. Sandpoint, Idaho; United States; 48°16′08″N 116°34′12″W

Information
- Type: Public
- School district: Lake Pend Oreille S.D. #84
- Principal: Jacqueline Crossingham
- Teaching staff: 57.99 (FTE)
- Grades: 9–12
- Enrollment: 1,021 (2023–2024)
- Student to teacher ratio: 17.61
- Colors: Red and white
- Athletics: IHSAA Class 5A
- Athletics conference: Inland Empire League (5A)
- Mascot: Bulldog
- Rivals: Lakeland, Moscow
- Yearbook: Monticola
- Website: sh.lposd.org
- Sandpoint High School
- U.S. National Register of Historic Places
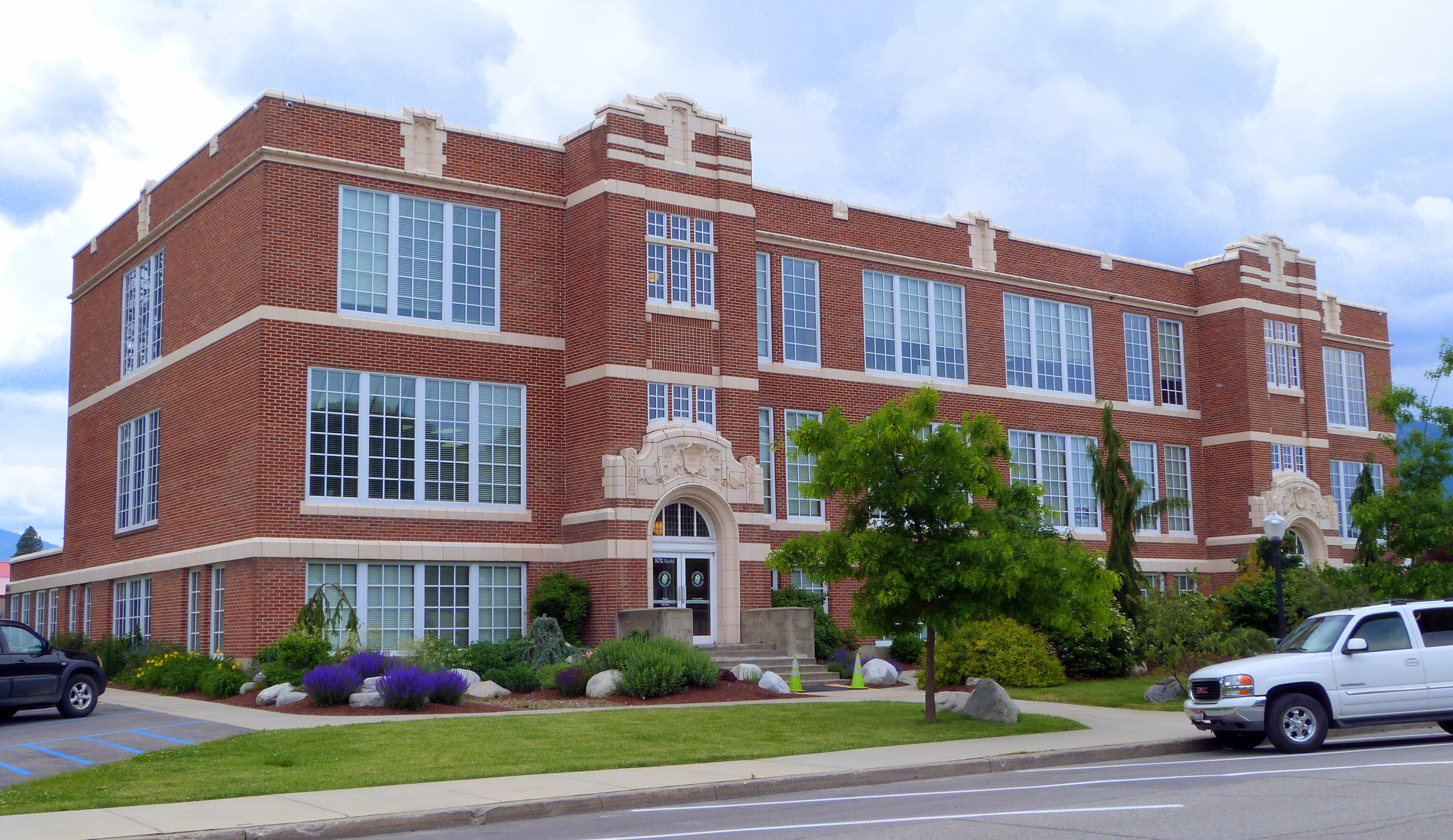
- Former building (1922) from southeast in 2015

- Location within Idaho Location within the United States
- Location: 102 S. Euclid Avenue; Sandpoint, Idaho, U.S.
- Coordinates: 48.2726°N 116.5544°W
- Area: less than one acre
- Built: 1922; 104 years ago
- Built by: Jasper & McLellan
- Architect: Whitehouse & Price
- Architectural style: Classical Revival
- MPS: Public School Buildings in Idaho MPS
- NRHP reference No.: 99001277
- Added to NRHP: October 28, 1999

Sandpoint High School is a four-year public secondary school in the northwest United States, located in Sandpoint, Idaho. It is the larger of the two high schools in the Lake Pend Oreille School District; the other is Clark Fork in Class 1A. The SHS school colors are red and white and the mascot is a bulldog.

== Athletics ==
Sandpoint competes in IHSAA Class 5A, the second-highest classification in the state. It is a member of the Inland Empire League (5A), along with Lakeland (in nearby Rathdrum) and Moscow, 135 miles (220 km) south.

SHS formerly had rivalries with Coeur d'Alene they are now in IEL 6A.

=== State titles ===
Boys

- Soccer 13: fall (A-1 Div II, now 4A) 2000, (4A) 1995, 1996, 1997, 1998, 1999, 2000, 2001, 2002, 2004, 2006, 2008, 2009, 2012 (introduced in 2000)
- Football (1): fall (A-1 Div.II, now 4A) 1997
- Wrestling (6): (A-1, now 5A) 1994, 1995, 1996; (4A) 2001, 2002, 2003 (introduced in 1958)
- Track (1): (4A) 2003
- Baseball (1): (4A) 2006

Girls

- Soccer (8): fall (A-1 Div II, now 4A) 2000, (4A) 2001, 2002, 2004, 2009, 2013, 2014, 2019 2014 (introduced in 2000)
- Volleyball (14): fall (A-1, now 5A) 1980, 1982, 1983, 1984, 1985, 1986, 1994, 1995, 1999;
  (A-1 Div II, now 4A) 2000, (4A) 2002, 2003, 2006, 2008 (introduced in 1976)
- Cross Country (3): fall (4A) 2002, 2013, 2014,(introduced in 1986)

== Academic Decathlon ==
The school's Academic Decathlon program has been successful in statewide and national competitions. The 2006 team placed first at the Idaho Academic Decathlon State Competition and traveled to San Antonio for the national finals, placing 17th overall and earning the title "Rookie of the Year" in Division II. In 2008, Sandpoint won six of the nine overall individual medals and placed second in the state; SHS scored its highest team score ever, with more than 43,000 points out of a possible 60,000.

The 2009 team represented Idaho in the online nationals competition for medium-sized schools and placed first overall.

In 2010, the state competition was hosted by Sandpoint, the first time it was held outside the Boise area in its 26-year history. SHS defeated Centennial of Boise in March. represented Idaho at the national championship in April at Omaha, Nebraska, and finished fifth in Division II.

== Historic building ==
The previous SHS building of 1922, located less than a mile northeast at 102 S. Euclid Avenue, was later used as an office building. Listed on the National Register of Historic Places in 1999, it is now the Sandpoint campus of North Idaho College for residents of Bonner County.

== Alumni ==
- Dick Arndt (class of 1962), NFL defensive tackle, Pittsburgh Steelers (1967–1970)
- Leon Cadore, Major League Baseball player (1915–24); Brooklyn Dodgers, Chicago White Sox, New York Giants
- Bob Kennedy (class of 1939), AAFC / NFL halfback (1946–1950)
- Jerry Kramer (class of 1954), All-Pro NFL guard, Pro Football Hall of Fame, Green Bay Packers (1958–68); five NFL and first two Super Bowl titles
- Patrick F. McManus, humor writer and columnist
- Jared Rosholt, 4x state champion wrestler; 3x All-American at Oklahoma State; professional mixed martial artist formerly with the UFC, currently with the PFL
- Jake Rosholt, 3x state champion wrestler; ranked as the nation's top high school wrestling recruit (2001); 4x All-American at Oklahoma State, retired professional MMA fighter
- Frank L. VanderSloot, American entrepreneur, radio network owner, rancher, and political campaign financier; founder and chief executive officer of Melaleuca, Inc; listed in 2017 as the richest person in Idaho
