= KICR =

- Coeur d'Alene, Idaho; United States
- Broadcast area: Spokane metropolitan area
- Frequency: 102.3 MHz (HD Radio)
- Branding: K102 Country

Programming
- Format: Country music
- Subchannels: HD2: Rock "Rock 103"
- Affiliations: Compass Media Networks; Westwood One

Ownership
- Owner: Blue Sky Broadcasting; (Great Northern Broadcasting, Inc.)
- Sister stations: KIBR

History
- First air date: 1998-07-17 (as KBIH)
- Former call signs: KBIH (1998–2001)

Technical information
- Licensing authority: FCC
- Facility ID: 76431
- Class: A
- ERP: 172 watts
- HAAT: 562 meters (1,844 ft)
- Transmitter coordinates: 47°39′35″N 116°57′12″W

Links
- Public license information: Public file; LMS
- Webcast: Listen Live
- Website: k102country.com

KICR (102.3 FM) is a commercial radio station broadcasting a country music radio format. Licensed to Coeur d'Alene, Idaho, the station serves the Spokane metropolitan area. It is owned by Blue Sky Broadcasting and calls itself "K102 Country".

KICR has an effective radiated power (ERP) of 172 watts. The transmitter is on West Apple Blossom Road in Post Falls, Idaho.

== History ==
The station went on the air as KBIH on July 17, 1998. On October 2, 2001, the station changed its call sign to the current KICR.
