= Schweitzer Mountain =

Ski area in Idaho, United States

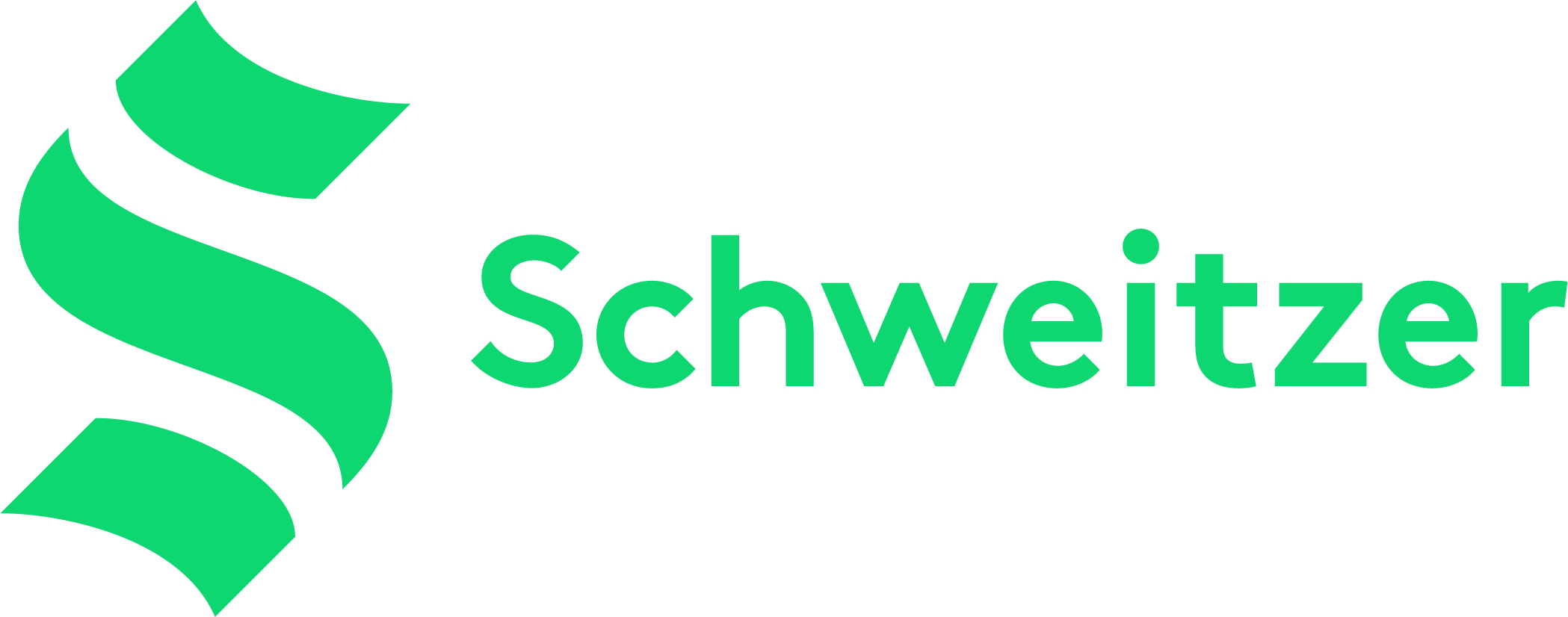

- Location in Idaho Schweitzer Mountain (the United States)
- Location: Bonner County, Idaho, U.S.
- Nearest city: Sandpoint; 11 miles (18 km); Spokane, Washington; 80 miles (130 km)
- Coordinates: 48.367°N 116.623°W
- Owner: Alterra Mountain Company
- Vertical: 2,440 ft (744 m)
- Top elevation: 6,400 ft (1,951 m)
- Base elevation: 3,960 ft (1,207 m) lowest chair - Stella; 4,700 ft (1,433 m) main village
- Skiable area: 2,900 acres (11.7 km^{2})
- Trails: 92: 20% beginner; 40% intermediate; 35% advanced; 5% expert
- Longest run: Little Blue Ridge; 2.1 miles (3.4 km)
- Lift system: 10 chairlifts: 1 high-speed six-pack; 4 high-speed quads; 2 triples; 1 doubles; 2 surface tows
- Lift capacity: 15,900 / hour
- Terrain parks: 3
- Snowfall: 300 in (760 cm)
- Snowmaking: 200 acres (0.81 km^{2})
- Night skiing: 2 chairlifts
- Website: schweitzer.com

Schweitzer is a ski resort in the northwest United States in northern Idaho, 11 miles (18 km) northwest of Sandpoint. Located in Bonner County in the Selkirk Mountains, it overlooks Lake Pend Oreille to the southeast with views of the Bitterroot and Cabinet mountain ranges. The ski area is approximately 45 miles (70 km) south of the Canada–US border. Doing business as Schweitzer Mountain Resort since 1988, in April 2021 the ski area adjusted its brand name to drop the words "mountain resort" to now be known only as "Schweitzer."

The resort's principal peak, Schweitzer Mountain, has a summit elevation of 6,400 feet (1,951 m) above sea level with a vertical drop of 2,440 feet (744 m). There are 92 named runs and open bowls on Schweitzer's skiable area of 2,900 acres (11.7 km^{2}), served by 10 lifts. The average annual snowfall is over 300 inches (7.6 metres). The longest continuous groomed run is Little Blue Ridge Run, at 2.1 miles (3.4 km), and the uphill lift capacity is 15,900 passengers per hour.

== History ==
=== Early history ===
The peak known as "Schweitzer Mountain" was named after an old Swiss hermit who lived at the bottom of the basin (Schweizer is German for "Swiss"). He had been in the Swiss military, and, as part of a crime investigation, his house was searched. It yielded the bodies of numerous local cats that had gone missing. According to local legend, the man enjoyed cat stew; as a result, Mr. Schweitzer was soon hauled off to the asylum and forgotten, but his name remains with the mountain.

Skiing at Schweitzer began as early as 1933, but the ski area opened thirty years later as "Schweitzer Basin" in the fall of 1963. Jack Fowler of Spokane was an avid skier and frequently drove to The Big Mountain in Whitefish, Montana, in the late 1950s; he looked for a closer alternative and had noticed the snow-laden mountain on many of his trips. After several years of garnering support in the Sandpoint area, the ski area was launched. Opening day was December 4, with a day lodge at 4,700 feet (1,433 m) and a mile-long (1.6 km) double chairlift, which provided 1,700 feet (518 m) of vertical drop; a T-bar lift was added a month later. In 1991, Jack Fowler wrote Looking Back on Schweitzer: The History of Schweitzer Mountain Resort with co-author Ross Woodward, covering the history of the resort from his inspiration in the 1960s to the plans for the 1990/91 ski season.

During the 1960s Schweitzer made a profit in only one year. Initially planned as a weekend-only ski area, it was operated seven days a week at the insistence of Sam Wormington, the area's first general manager. It was immediately popular with regional skiers, and tallied 55,000 visits in its fourth season. A second T-bar was added in 1965, another in 1967, and three chairlifts (Papa Bear, Mama Bear, Baby Bear) were added in the fall of 1968, relocating T-bars and rope tows.

The back area of Colburn Basin was developed in 1971 with two more chairlifts (#5 & #6) and a small day lodge, the Out Back Inn. More construction in 1972 added a base area restaurant, 36-unit overnight lodge, and a 20-unit condominium building. The road to the resort was paved in 1973 and Chairlift #7 was added in the summer of 1974 to add capacity to the front side and eliminate the uphill trek to Chair #1. General manager Wormington left in 1977 for Mt. Spokane and was succeeded by Pierre Huguenin, and the area soon dropped the "Basin" from its name and became just "Schweitzer."

=== The Brown Era ===
For its first two decades, the ski area was a non-profit corporation, with hundreds of stockholders. Co-founder Jim Brown, Jr., a sawmill owner from Sandpoint, took it private in the early 1980s. Summer chairlift rides were begun in 1986, and in 1988 the ski area was renamed Schweitzer Mountain Resort, and it began offering hiking trails and mountain bike rentals.

When Brown died in April 1989, his daughter, Bobbie Huguenin, took over the family business. Under her leadership, Schweitzer focused on becoming a destination resort; many additions and improvements were accomplished, including the replacement of the original lodge with the new 3-story Headquarters Day Lodge. A detachable quad chairlift in the fall of 1990, as well as lights for night skiing. Huguenin also saw the construction of the 82-room Green Gables Lodge. Ultimately, the Brown family ran out of operating cash and was unable to market the resort as a destination alternative. In November 1996, the resort was put into receivership, filing for bankruptcy the following year.

=== The Harbor Era ===
On December 31, 1998, Harbor Properties purchased Schweitzer Mountain Resort from U.S. Bank for the sum of $18 million. The Seattle-based company, operators of Stevens Pass and Mission Ridge (sold in 2003) ski areas in Washington, made immediate improvements by providing equipment for slope management. The Green Gables lodge was extensively remodeled, individual units were offered for sale, and the complex re-opened as the Selkirk Lodge. A six-passenger chairlift (Stella) was installed in the summer of 2000, serving the Northwest Territory in Colburn Basin. The high-speed Stella six-pack replaced chairlift #5, a fixed grip double. With the addition of Stella, the resort totaled 2,500 acres (10.1 km^{2}).

In 2003, the mountain added a new dimension to its array of services, Selkirk Powder Company a.k.a. Selkirk Powder, a State of Idaho licensed outfitter and guide service. Selkirk Powder is an independent concession founded by Ken Barrett and Chip Kamin (d 2013). Selkirk Powder Company operates on Schweitzer private property outside of the ski area boundary and the abutting Priest Lake State Forest. Selkirk Powder began guided tour operations with snowmobile tours from the summit of Schweitzer into the Priest River Valleys. Selkirk Powder began offering snowcat skiing in 2007. In 2017 Selkirk Powder began offering helicopter skiing.

=== The McCaw Era ===
In July 2005, the mountain's ownership status changed again when Harbor Resorts' ownership was dissolved, leaving the resort with a sole owner—McCaw Investment Group (MIG) of Seattle. This allowed for the addition of the Idyl-Our T-Bar, the Hermit's Hollow Tubing Center, and a SunKid Magic Carpet in time for the 2005-06 season. The Idyle-Our T-Bar/Little Blue expansion added 400 acres (1.6 km^{2}), five new named trails, and increased backcountry and sidecountry opportunities.

In February 2007, Schweitzer announced an ambitious expansion program. Included was a $6 million lift expansion, primarily the replacement of the original lift at the resort, Chair One, with two lifts: a high-speed detachable quad, the Basin Express, on the lower portion, and a fixed-grip triple lift, the Lakeview Triple, on the upper portion. The Basin Express uses the old Chair Seven liftline, to the right of Chair One's. (Former Chairs Two, Three, & Seven were removed in the 1990 to make way for construction on the Great Escape Quad; they roughly paralleled Chair One, but did not reach the summit.) The chairs were installed in the summer of 2007. Also included in the program was a Lakeview Lodge remodel, increased snowmaking and new grooming capacity, new chairs on the Great Escape Quad, and $2 million for infrastructure and planning for future expansions.

Also in 2007, Schweitzer Mountain Land & Timber Company, the real estate arm of Schweitzer Mountain Resort, released 35 new ski-in/ski-out lots, approved for 1-4 units per lot, for sale in the Trapper's Creek-1 subdivision. By winter of 2007-08, heated roads, skier underpasses and utilities were installed. Late in 2008 it was decided that all real estate offerings by Schweitzer be put on hold until further notice, due to the ongoing financial crisis and "the fact that much of life around here revolves around skiing." Schweitzer Mountain Real Estate (dba Schweitzer Land & Timber Company) was merged with New Schweitzer, LLC, giving President and CEO Tom Chasse more power regarding the overall "experience" of the resort and how the real estate fits in with the skiing. Once development begins again, the next real estate release after Trapper's Creek will likely be the first homesites in the GreyHawk neighborhood, a single-family development pad below Musical Chairs with 2-to-4-acre (0.8 to 1.6 ha) lots.

In addition to the Trapper's Creek and GreyHawk neighborhoods, Schweitzer was also looking in 2008 for outside developers to build up to five new condominium buildings in Schweitzer village with up to 50 units each, similar to the White Pine Lodge. The parcels were put on the market with Schweitzer Land & Timber Company, only to be removed a few months later.

In late 2009, the resort began construction on Mountainside at Schweitzer—a re-envisioned Trapper's Creek. Three fractional ownership LEED-certified homes and one LEED-certified full ownership home were completed in the spring of 2009. Special attention has been paid to the environment, with local building materials, geothermal heating, and an architectural style that evokes northern Idaho. It is unclear whether all new homes in Mountainside at Schweitzer will be LEED-certified. Thirty lots remain to be developed.

While capital expenditure projects at Schweitzer during winter 2009-2011 were largely subdued infrastructure and customer service improvements (including a new website and mobile presence, a renewed commitment to customer service, and a new family-centric lodging program dubbed "The Schweitzer Difference"), the summer of 2012 was marked by more significant and visible development. The exterior of the Mill Building, one of the oldest buildings remaining in Schweitzer Village, was extensively remodeled and repainted. On the inside, the Ski & Ride Center was revamped, featuring a more logical flow from registration to rentals and lessons. Gourmandie was expanded with new space and artisanal food options. The Great Escape Quad received a new electrical system, increasing its reliability and efficiency. Finally, the Musical Chairs double was extensively rebuilt, with a new drive, new paint, and new chairs featuring restraining bars.

In early 2013, discussion turned to an expansion of the White Pine Lodge with twenty new units on the south side of the building, near the current main parking lot. Sales of those additional units began in 2013, with three sold in the first month on the market, but additional sales lagged and the project was shelved.

=== The Alterra Era ===
In June 2023, Alterra Mountain Company announced it had entered an agreement to purchase Schweitzer. The change in ownership followed a rebrand and the addition of Schweitzer to Ikon Pass, a multi-resort ski pass. The acquisition generated a mixed local reaction. In an interview, Schweitzer President and CEO Tom Chasse stated the reception was "a little bit of both," noting that while some passholders were "stoked" for the unlimited Ikon Pass access, others were "concerned about overcrowding."

== Present development ==
Schweitzer's village currently contains two condominium-hotels: The Selkirk Lodge and The White Pine Lodge. The Selkirk Lodge features traditional hotel-style rooms, some with Kitchenettes, and others with bunk beds, called "Family Suites." The White Pine Lodge features one-, two-, and four-bedroom units with full kitchens and lofts. Hundreds of private residences and condominiums are also available throughout the lower and upper village. The Mill Building houses ski rental/repair and a retail shop, The Source. The day lodge in the village, the Lakeview Lodge, houses ticket sales, the Season Pass Office, Guest Services, Taps (a full-service bar), the Lakeview Cafe (a cafeteria), Cabinet Mountain Coffee (a coffee shop), ski patrol and daycare services. There are two additional day lodges on the mountain. Sky House, which operates both winter and summer at the top of the Great Escape lift, houses ski patrol, restrooms, a counter service restaurant (Red Hawk Cafe, operates in winter only), and a full-service restaurant and bar (The Nest). The Outback Inn, near the base of the Stella lift, has cafeteria service and restrooms.

In 2019, plans for a 30-unit boutique hotel in the village were announced; named the Humbird Hotel, it opened in February 2022. In July 2021, to meet a critical workforce housing shortage throughout greater Sandpoint area, the resort broke ground on a $22 million, 84-unit apartment complex in Ponderay. Also in autumn 2022, Schweitzer announced plans for a new arrival area for the resort under construction, dubbed Base Camp. The new area will include replacement and extension of the Musical Chairs chairlift and parking for an additional 1,400 vehicles.

== Climate ==
Climate data for Schweitzer Basin, ID, 2006-2020
Month	Jan	Feb	Mar	Apr	May	Jun	Jul	Aug	Sep	Oct	Nov	Dec	Year
Mean daily maximum °F (°C)	28.2 (−2.1)	28.7 (−1.8)	34.4 (1.3)	41.4 (5.2)	51.4 (10.8)	56.3 (13.5)	66.8 (19.3)	65.6 (18.7)	56.0 (13.3)	42.1 (5.6)	31.8 (−0.1)	25.8 (−3.4)	44.0 (6.7)
Mean daily minimum °F (°C)	19.5 (−6.9)	18.0 (−7.8)	23.2 (−4.9)	28.3 (−2.1)	37.0 (2.8)	42.6 (5.9)	51.4 (10.8)	50.9 (10.5)	43.7 (6.5)	32.7 (0.4)	23.9 (−4.5)	17.2 (−8.2)	32.4 (0.2)
Average precipitation inches (mm)	6.91 (176)	5.86 (149)	7.70 (196)	4.40 (112)	3.38 (86)	3.25 (83)	0.92 (23)	1.00 (25)	1.72 (44)	4.72 (120)	8.09 (205)	6.62 (168)	54.57 (1,387)
Average extreme snow depth inches (cm)	104 (260)	125 (320)	142 (360)	145 (370)	125 (320)	64 (160)	6 (15)	0 (0)	1 (2.5)	8 (20)	37 (94)	71 (180)	143 (360)
Average precipitation days	18.1	16.6	18.9	15.6	13.7	10.7	4.9	4.3	6.9	11.5	17.4	16.3	154.9
Source: NOAA

== Statistics ==
=== Elevation & Geography ===
- Village Elevation: 4,700 ft (1,433 m) - Main Village
- Summit Elevation: 6,400 ft (1,951 m) - Top of Great Escape Quad
- Bottom Lift Elevation: 3,960 ft (1,207 m) - Outback Inn
- Vertical Feet: 2,440 ft (744 m)
- 2,000–4,400 ft (610–1,341 m) above the surrounding land

=== Terrain & Snow ===
- 300 inches (760 cm) of snowfall
- 2,900 acres (12 km^{2}) skiable inbounds
- 10% beginner
- 40% intermediate
- 35% advanced
- 15% expert
- 32 km (20 mi) of nordic trails (winter: cross country skiing, snowshoeing, fat tire biking)
- > 40 km (25 mi) of hiking and biking trails (summer)

=== Current Lifts ===
Name	Type	Manufacturer	Installation Year	Vertical Rise	Ride Time
Basin Express	CLD-4	Doppelmayr CTEC	2007	1,063 ft	4 mins
Lakeview Triple	CLF-3	Doppelmayr CTEC	2007	710 ft	4.5 mins
Creekside Express	CLD-4	Leitner-Poma	2023	514 ft	4 mins
Great Escape	CLD-4	Lift Engineering/Doppelmayr	1990/1997	1,678 ft	5 mins
Sunnyside	CLF-2	Riblet	1968	1,280 ft	8 mins
Stella	CLD-6	Garaventa CTEC	2000	1,550 ft	6 mins
Cedar Park Express	CLD-4	Leitner-Poma	2019	1,447 ft	5 mins
Colburn Triple	CLF-3	SkyTrac	2019	1,360 ft	8 mins
Idyle Our	SL-2	Doppelmayr CTEC	2005	160 ft	4 mins
Musical Carpet	Carpet	Sunkid	2005	100 ft	4 mins

== In the press ==
- "#21 in the USA" - 2007 Skiing Magazine Reader Resort Survey
- "#3 in the USA for Tree Skiing" - 2007 Skiing Magazine Reader Resort Survey
- "Best Resort in the Inland Northwest" - The Inlander Reader's Poll, 13 years running
- "Big Slopes and small-town charm at Northern Idaho's up-and-coming resort." - Sunset Magazine, Dec. 2003
- "#3 in the USA for Lifts" - SKI Magazine, October 2008
- "Best Place to Ditch the Crowds" - Skiing Magazine - October 2008"
