= Patrick F. McManus =

American humor writer (1933–2018)

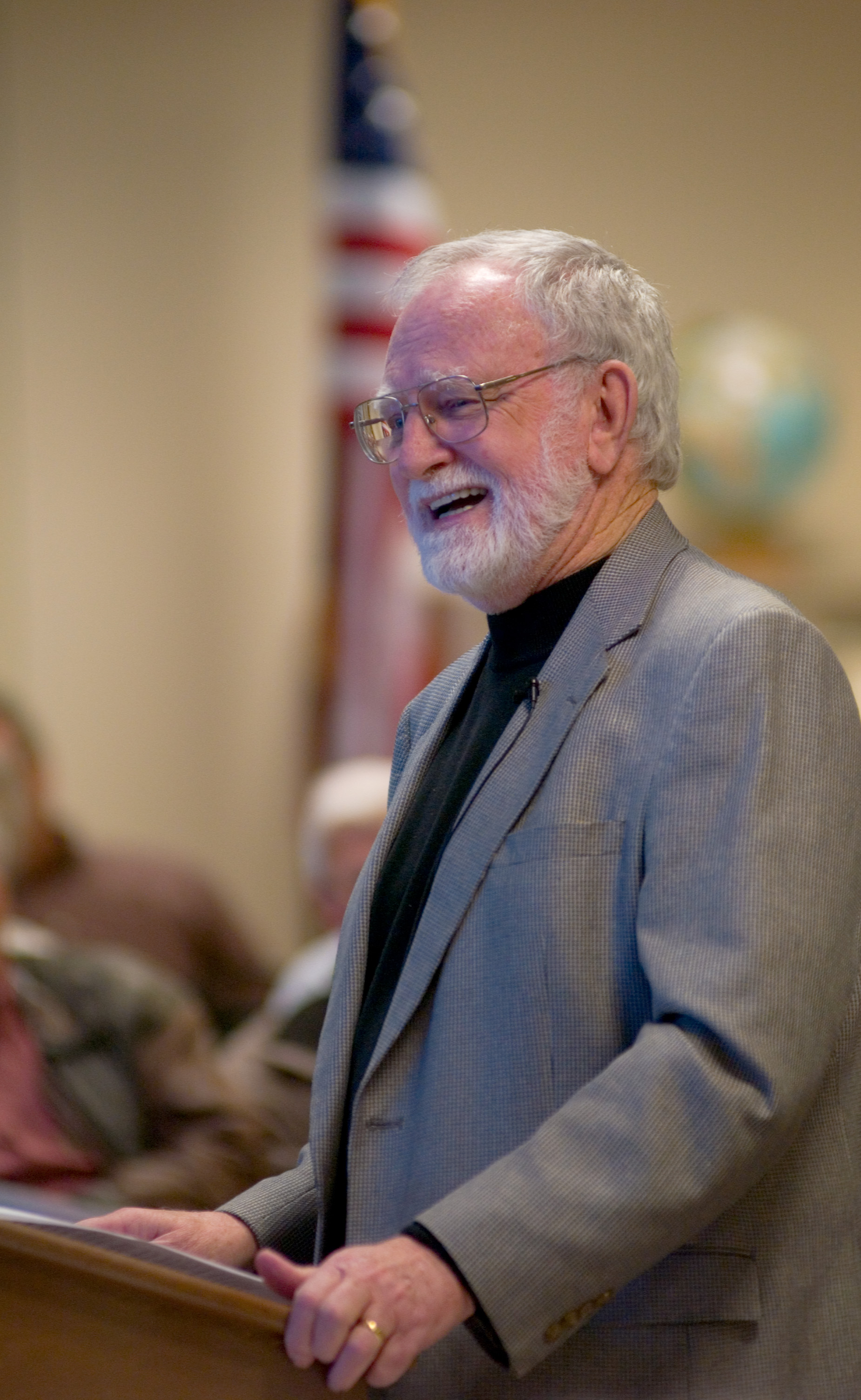
- Born: August 25, 1933; Sandpoint, Idaho
- Died: April 11, 2018 (aged 84); Spokane, Washington
- Occupations: educator, columnist, editor, author
- Spouse: Darlene McManus
- Children: Four daughters
- Writing career
- Subjects: Humor, outdoors

Patrick Francis McManus (August 25, 1933 – April 11, 2018) was an American educator and humor writer, who primarily wrote about the outdoors. A humor columnist and editor for Outdoor Life from 1983 to 2009, and Field & Stream from 1977 to 1982, as well as other magazines, his columns and stories have been collected in several books, beginning with A Fine and Pleasant Misery (1978) up through The Good Samaritan Strikes Again (1992) and The Horse in My Garage and Other Stories (2012).

== Biography ==
McManus was born and raised in Sandpoint, Idaho. His father, who served in the 42nd ("Rainbow") Division under Douglas MacArthur during World War I, died when Patrick was six. Although his mother later remarried a man named Hank, for the most part he was raised by his mother, grandmother, and older sister Patricia McManus Gass (referred to in his childhood stories as "the Troll"). His family didn't have much money and lived on a small farm on the banks of Sand Creek where they grew most of their own food. They had chickens, a milk cow and pigs and went hunting and fishing.

After graduating from Sandpoint High School in 1952, McManus worked construction and other such jobs until he had saved enough money to attend Washington State College, now Washington State University, where he majored in journalism. He briefly worked as a news reporter before returning to graduate school at Washington State University where he earned a master's degree in 1959. From 1960 to 1983 he taught English, journalism and creative writing at Eastern Washington State College, now Eastern Washington University.

He was married to Darlene "Bun" McManus and had four daughters.

== Works ==
McManus wrote mostly about his outdoor adventures from his childhood with semi-fictional characters such as his old woodsman mentor Rancid Crabtree, his childhood friends Crazy Eddie Muldoon and Retch Sweeney, and his dog Strange. The stories' humor is mostly based on elaborate exaggerations of his surreal adventures in the outdoors. McManus's writing is characterized by a dry wit that has been compared to the writing styles of Mark Twain and Robert Benchley.

His last published work was Circles in the Snow (2014), the sixth in a series of mystery novels starring the character Sheriff Bo Tully. Other departures from his column-collections include Kid Camping from Aaaaiii! To Zip (1979), an alphabetized, and partially serious, listing of useful tips and concepts for beginning campers; Whatchagot Stew (1989), both a cookbook and a less-fictionalized memoir of his childhood; and The Deer on a Bicycle (2000), a discussion of the art of humor writing.

McManus also wrote five separate, distinct one-man comedies for his indentured actor, Tim Behrens. Tim has toured these shows to 21 states and two provinces in more than 1600 performances since 1992. They are: A Fine and Pleasant Misery; McManus In Love; Pot Luck; Poor Again...Dagnabbit!; and Scrambled McManus.

In October 2011, an index of his stories and novels titled "Where's the One About the Bobcat?" was compiled and published by Lauren Ball, making it easy for readers to find their favorite stories.

== Bibliography ==
Magazine Columns Collections

- A Fine and Pleasant Misery (1978)
- They Shoot Canoes, Don't They? (1981)
- Never Sniff a Gift Fish (1983)
- The Grasshopper Trap (1985)
- Rubber Legs and White Tail-Hairs (1987)
- The Night the Bear Ate Goombaw (1989)
- Real Ponies Don't Go Oink! (1991)
- The Good Samaritan Strikes Again (1992)
- How I Got This Way (1994)
- Never Cry "Arp!" and Other Great Adventures (1996)
- Into the Twilight, Endlessly Grousing (1997)
- I Fish; Therefore, I Am (2001) (anthology of 1st three books)
- The Bear in the Attic (2002)
- Kerplunk!: Stories (2007)
- The Horse in My Garage and Other Stories (2012)

Sheriff Bo Tully Mysteries

- The Blight Way: A Sheriff Bo Tully Mystery (2006)
- Avalanche: A Sheriff Bo Tully Mystery (2007)
- The Double-Jack Murders: A Sheriff Bo Tully Mystery (2009)
- The Huckleberry Murders: A Sheriff Bo Tully Mystery (2010)
- The Tamarack Murders: A Sheriff Bo Tully Mystery (2013)
- Circles in the Snow: A Sheriff Bo Tully Mystery (2014)

Other

- Kid Camping from Aaaaiii! to Zip (1979)
- Whatchagot Stew (1989), co-written with Patricia McManus Gass
- The Deer on a Bicycle: Excursions into the Writing of Humor (2000)

== Recurring elements ==
McManus' shorter works include a recurring cast of fictitious characters and running jokes, both from the stories set in his childhood and as an adult. The foremost among the childhood stories is his "mentor" Rancid Crabtree, a colorful woodsman who lives near Pat's childhood home, who doesn't bathe because he believes that soap and water would wash off his 'crust', which would let germs in. Other recurring characters are his childhood best friend, 'Crazy Eddie' Muldoon, his rough-and-tumble mutt appropriately named Strange, and his adulthood friends, the goofy and dim-witted Retch Sweeney, his straitlaced neighbor, Alphonse 'Al' Finley, and his rich friend Fenton Quagmire. Throughout the majority of the stories is a recurring theme of McManus's lifelong love of hunting and fishing—which is mostly an excuse to just enjoy the outdoors, often in good company. Most of his friends likewise enjoy hunting and fishing, even if they aren't particularly good at it. McManus, in his stories, has a certain amount of disgruntlement for people who take great pleasure in the minutiae of various sports (such as encyclopediac knowledge of firearms calibers and ballistics). He refers to firearms enthusiasts as 'gun nuts' and treats their excited sharing of the fine points of ballistic arcs and grain sizes as something to be endured to get on a good hunting trip.

Some of the elements show up in his longer works, and are even worked into the plots. Bo Tully, the protagonist of the Bo Tully Mysteries, shares McManus' views about firearms. In the course of his job as Sheriff and his hobbies, Tully uses guns, knows about guns, but isn't particularly excited by them or even sentimental towards them. He is, however, aware that many people are. This even serves as plot point in one of the Bo Tully mysteries.
