= The Panida Theater =

Coordinates: 48°16′30″N 116°32′51″W

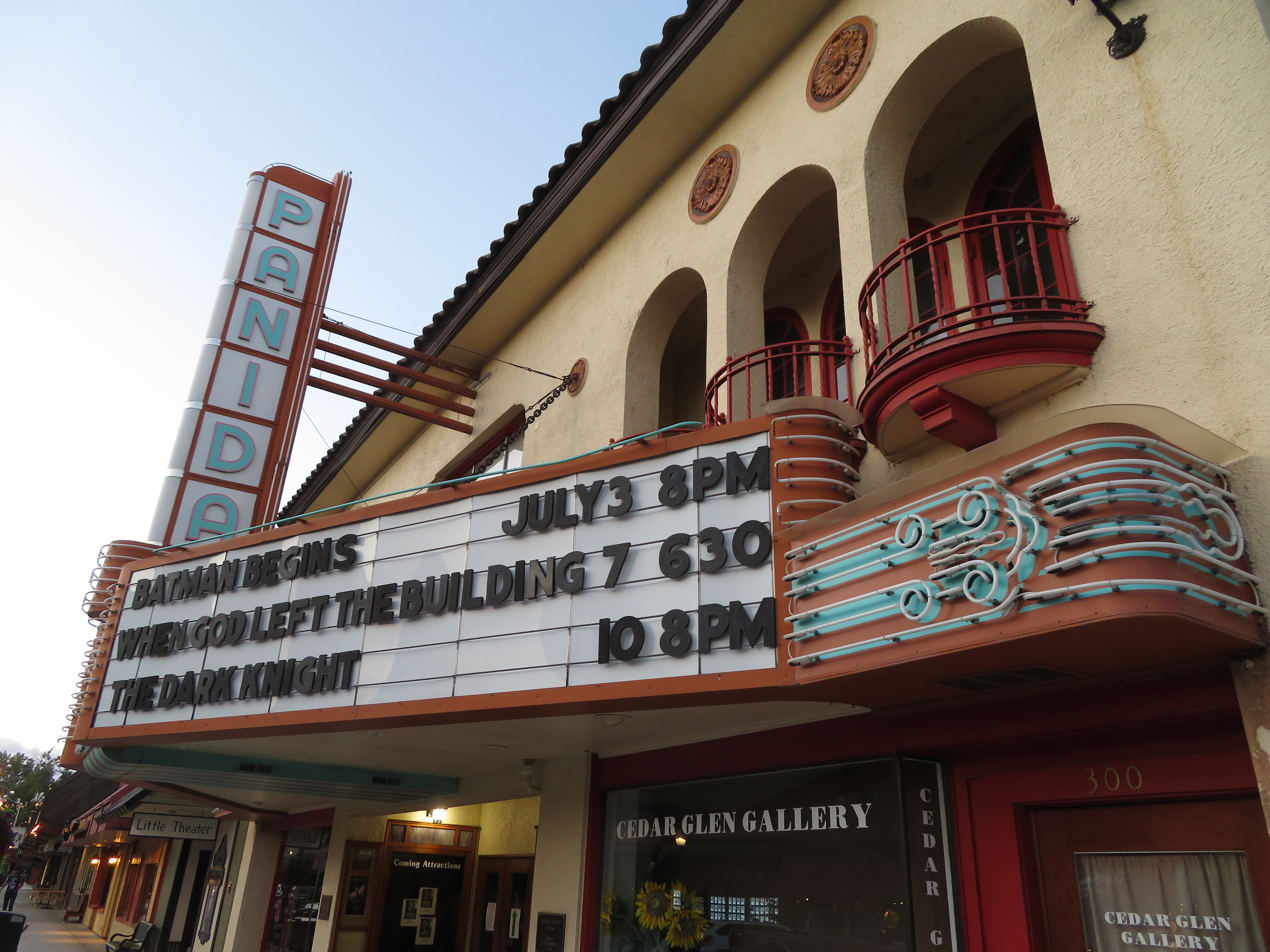
Panida Theater

The Panida (pronunciation: "rhymes with Canada") Theater is a small community theater in Sandpoint, Northern Idaho in the United States of America. The theater was built as a vaudeville and movie house by F.C. Weskil in 1927. Deriving its name from "the PANhandle of IDAho", The Panida opened as a vaudeville and movie house in 1927, and is listed on the National Register of Historic Places. Past performers have included Bonnie Raitt, Arlo Guthrie, Wynton Marsalis, and Mitch Miller. Actor Viggo Mortensen began his acting career at The Panida. They play host to art house films, current movies and past classics. They host concerts, business workshops, dance performances, comedy (including Gallagher on his final tour), live theatre and much more. They have an active film club and feature many film festivals.

After fading into disrepair from lack of maintenance and interest, a group of community members formed a nonprofit organization which bought the theater in 1985. The Panida Theater is operated through a nonprofit corporation under the direction of a board of trustees, elected at an annual meeting of theater members (persons who donate time or money to the theater and/or attend events). Day-to-day operations are overseen by an executive director, hired by the board of trustees and very small part-time staff.

In addition to performance events, including some locally produced, the theater is also a film venue, showing award-winning films such as Me and You and Everyone We Know and Paradise Now in a film series entitled "the Global Cinema Café," as well as selections from the Banff Mountain Film Festival.
