= KTPO =

- Kootenai, Idaho; United States
- Broadcast area: Bonner County, Idaho
- Frequency: 106.7 MHz (HD Radio)
- Branding: 106.7 Max FM

Programming
- Format: classic hits; HD2: "Rock 103" (mainstream rock); HD3: "105.3 The Beach" (top 40)

Ownership
- Owner: Hellroaring Communications L.L.C.

History
- First air date: 2007

Technical information
- Licensing authority: FCC
- Facility ID: 164177
- Class: C3
- ERP: 1,300 watts
- HAAT: 353 meters (1,158 ft)
- Transmitter coordinates: 48°13′44.7″N 116°30′33.7″W
- Translators: (102.9 MHz) K275CF (Sandpoint relays HD2); (105.3 MHz) K287BT (Sandpoint relays HD3)

Links
- Public license information: Public file; LMS
- Website: HD2: www.rock103fm.com; HD3: www.1053thebeach.com

KTPO (106.7 FM) is a radio station licensed to Kootenai, Idaho, owned by Hellroaring Communications L.L.C. It airs an adult album alternative format to the communities of Bonner County, Idaho.
