= Sandpoint, Idaho =

- City
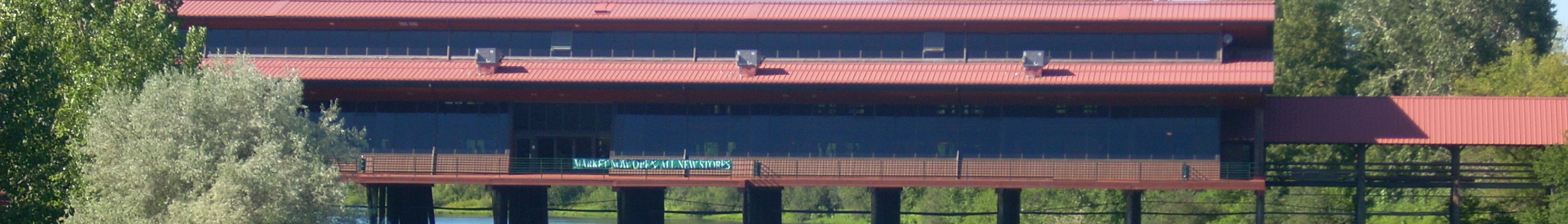
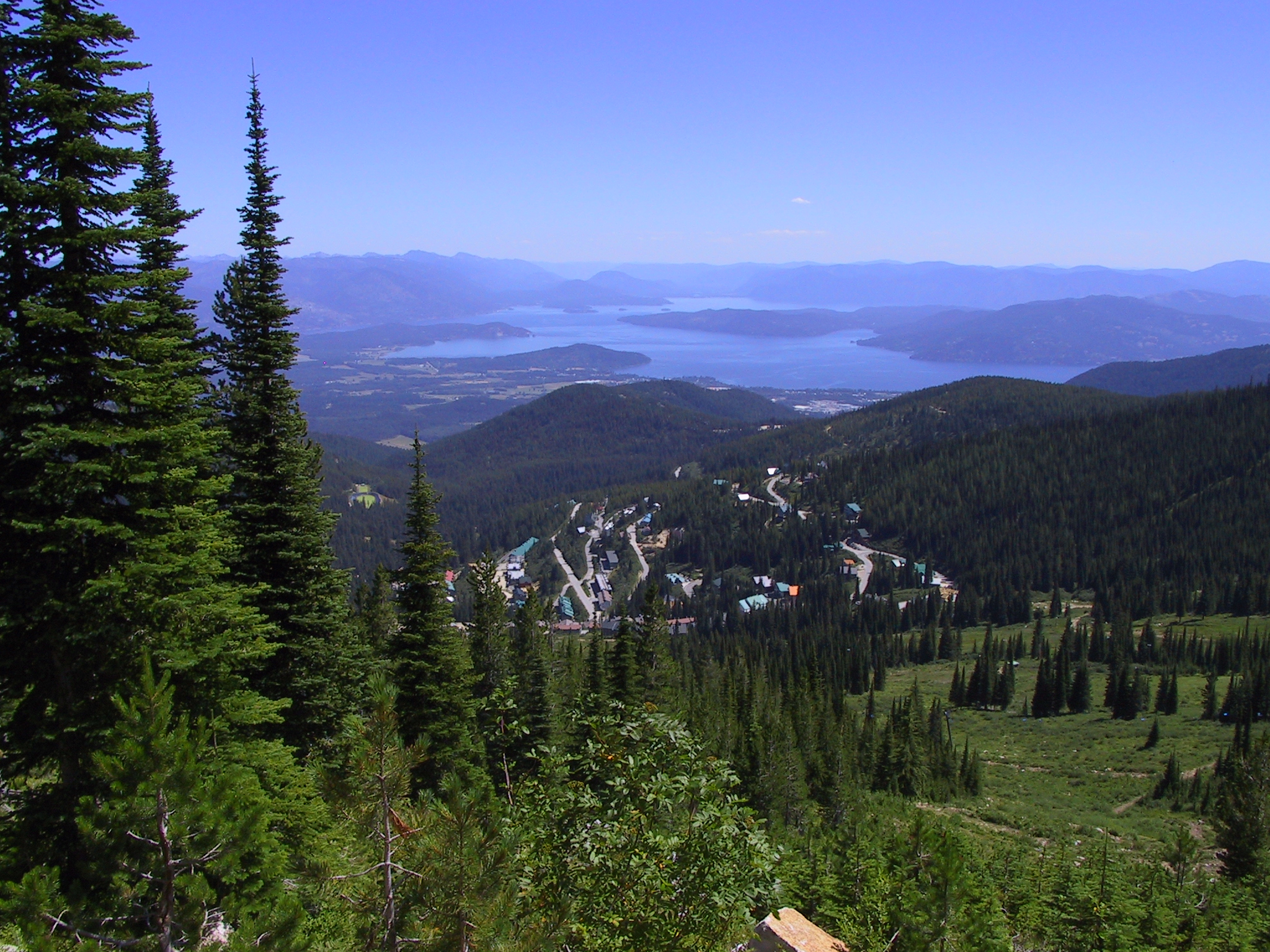
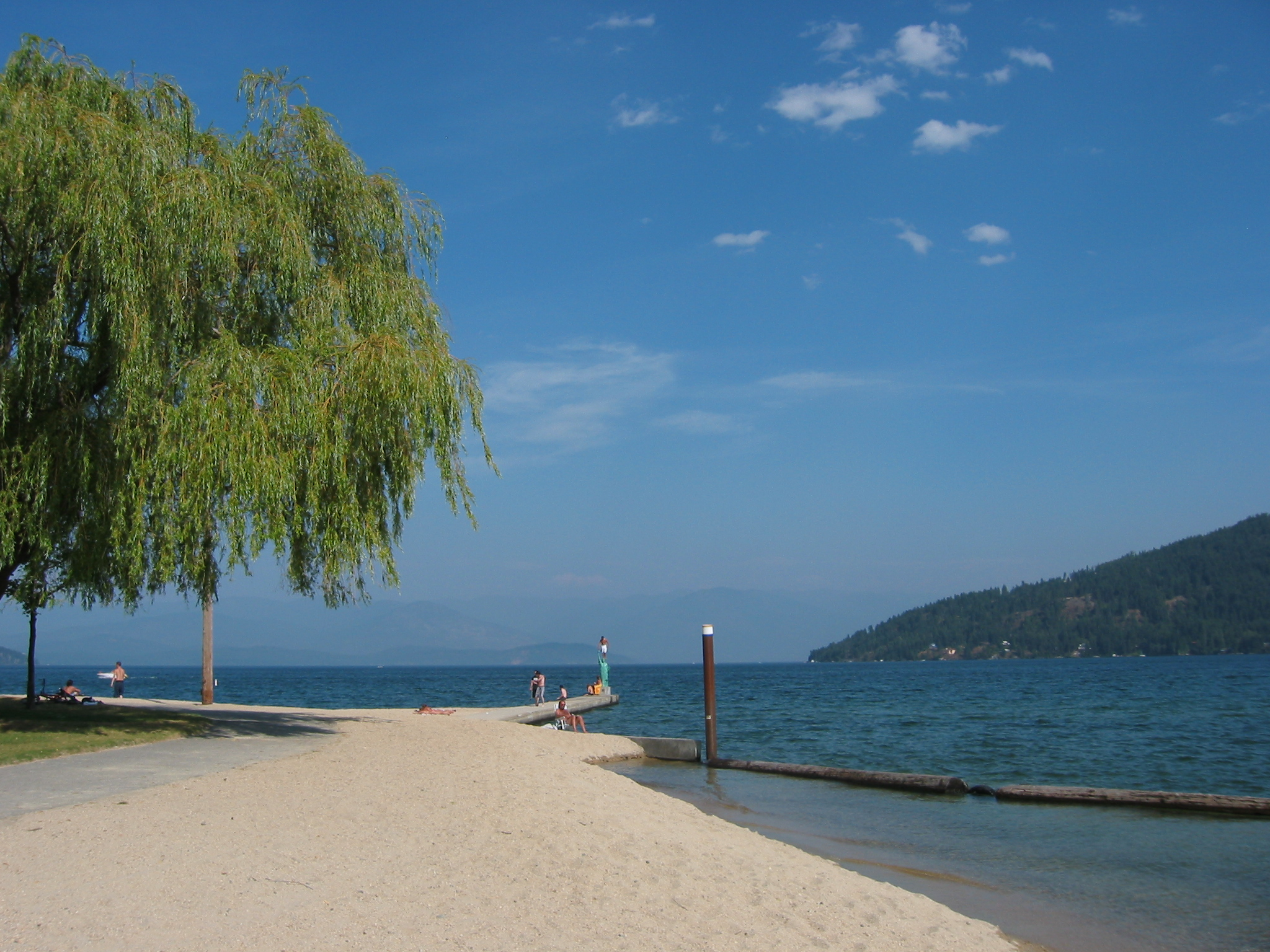
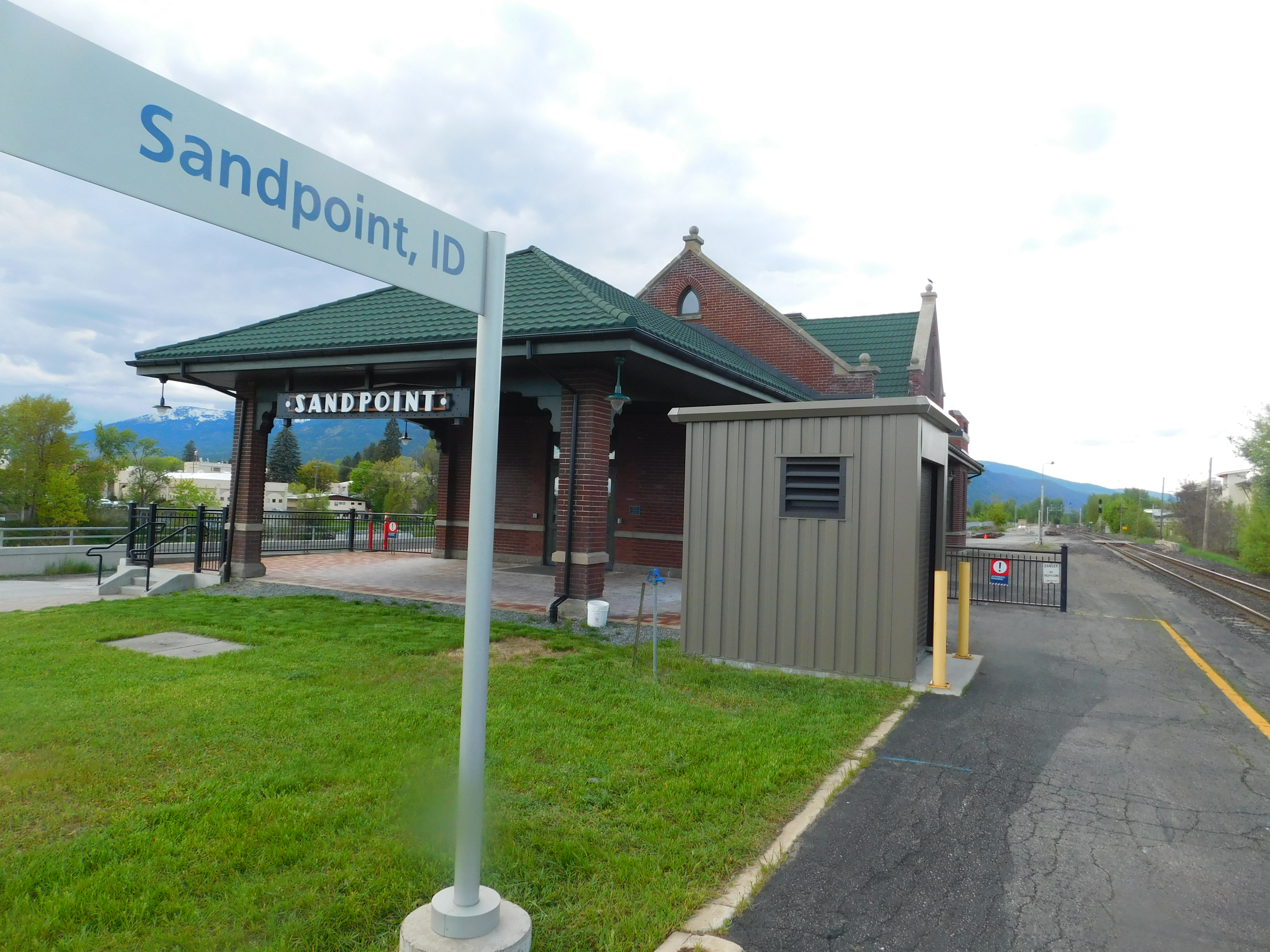
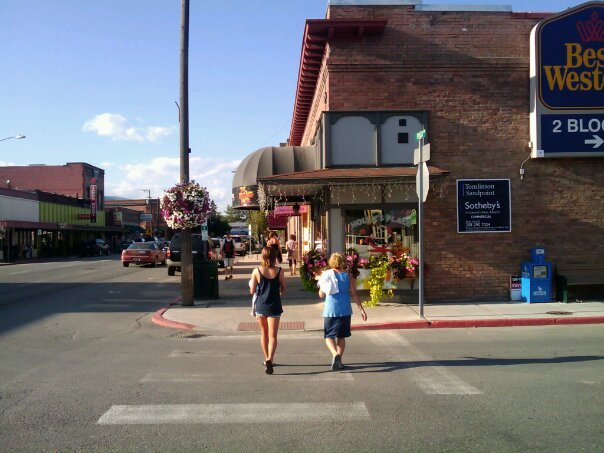
- Top row: Cedar Street Bridge Public Market; 2nd row: Sandpoint from Schweitzer Mountain; City Beach; 3rd row: Sandpoint Amtrak Station; Downtown Sandpoint

- Location of Sandpoint in Bonner County, Idaho
- Coordinates: 48°16′56″N 116°33′41″W
- Country: United States
- State: Idaho
- County: Bonner
- Incorporation: 1898

Area
  - Total: 4.56 sq mi (11.81 km^{2})
  - Land: 4.27 sq mi (11.05 km^{2})
  - Water: 0.30 sq mi (0.77 km^{2})
- Elevation: 2,113 ft (644 m)

Population (2020)
  - Total: 8,639
  - Density: 2,093.9/sq mi (808.46/km^{2})
- Demonym: Sandpointer
- Time zone: UTC-8 (Pacific (PST))
  - Summer (DST): UTC-7 (PDT)
- ZIP Code: 83864
- Area codes: 208, 986
- FIPS code: 16-72100
- GNIS feature ID: 2411808
- Website: www.sandpointidaho.gov

Sandpoint is the largest city in and the county seat of Bonner County, Idaho, United States. Its population was 9,777 in the 2022 U.S. census estimate.

Sandpoint's major economic contributors include forest products, light manufacturing, tourism, recreation and government services. As the largest service center in the two northern Idaho counties (Bonner and Boundary), as well as northwestern Montana, it has an active retail sector.

Sandpoint lies on the shores of Idaho's largest lake, 43-mile-long (69-kilometer) Lake Pend Oreille, and is surrounded by three major mountain ranges, the Selkirk, Cabinet and Bitterroot ranges. It is home to Schweitzer Mountain Resort, Idaho's largest ski resort, and is on the International Selkirk Loop and two National Scenic Byways (Wild Horse Trail and Pend Oreille Scenic Byway). Among other distinctions awarded by national media in the past decade, in 2011 Sandpoint was named the nation's "Most Beautiful Small Town" by Rand McNally and USA Today.

== History ==
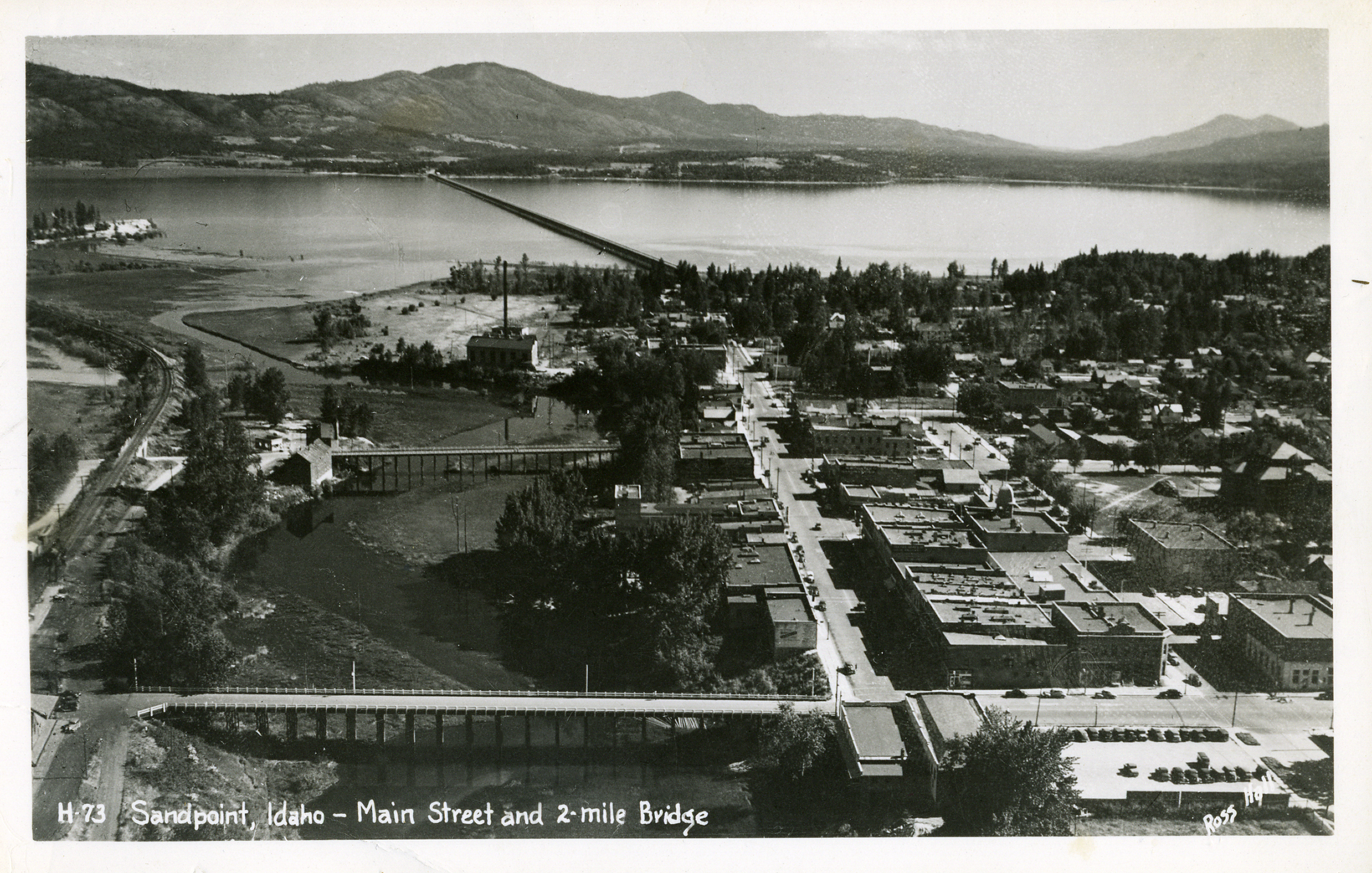
Sandpoint c. 1940

Salish Tribes, specifically the Kalispel and the Kootenai, built encampments on the shore of Lake Pend Oreille every summer, fished, made baskets of cedar, and collected huckleberries before returning to either Montana or Washington in the fall. The encampments ended before 1930.

The region was extensively explored by David Thompson of the North West Company starting in 1807. Disputed joint British/American occupation of the Columbia District led to the Oregon boundary dispute. This controversy ended in 1846 with the signing of the Oregon Treaty, whereby Britain ceded all rights to land south of the 49th parallel.

In the 1880s, the Northern Pacific Railroad brought European and Chinese settlement to the area.

In August 1888, 29-year-old author and civil servant Theodore Roosevelt visited Sandpoint on a caribou-hunting trip in the Selkirk Mountains. Roosevelt documented what a rough-and-tumble environment "Sand Point" was at that time (and for many decades following).

Sandpoint was officially incorporated in 1898.

Timber harvesting and railroads drove the economy for nearly a century as loggers moved in from the over-harvested Great Lakes region. Several lumber companies operated in the region from as early as 1896 to present, the most notable being the Humbird Lumber Company which operated from 1900 to around 1944. The lumber companies bought land from the Northern Pacific Railroad and built a major mill at Sandpoint and adjacent Kootenai. Lumber company-owned railroads extended into many of the local drainages including Grouse Creek, Gold Creek and Rapid Lightning Creek. Although the trees were never exhausted in the area, Humbird Lumber succumbed to the low timber prices of the Great Depression.

"Stump ranches" were sold by Humbird to many families who slowly cleared much of the valley land of tree stumps. Farming and ranching became the third largest business in the area, behind lumber and railroads, prior to the "discovery" of Lake Pend Oreille as a sports fishery in the 1950s. The economy was given a boost during World War II from Farragut Naval Station, a training center for the US Navy located at the southwestern end of Lake Pend Oreille.

The opening of Schweitzer Mountain Resort in 1963 turned the area into a year-round tourism destination. The beauty of the surrounding Selkirk and Cabinet Mountains and Lake Pend Oreille has kept Sandpoint a tourist favorite for water sports, hunting, hiking, horseback riding, fishing and skiing.

In the 1980s and 1990s, 30 miles (48 km) south of Sandpoint, the areas of Coeur d'Alene and Hayden Lake attracted nationwide publicity when white supremacist Neo-Nazi groups (most notably Aryan Nations) set up headquarters in the area. Many Sandpoint residents reacted negatively to such groups; some formed the Bonner County Human Rights Task Force in opposition. In 2001, Aryan Nations lost a lawsuit filed against them. The lawsuit bankrupted the organization and forced them to give up their Hayden Lake property and disband. In December 2011, Sandpoint became the first city in Idaho to pass an ordinance prohibiting discrimination in housing, employment and public accommodations based on sexual orientation or gender identity. In 2025, however, after it was rumored that a transgender woman had been spotted using the women’s changing room at the YMCA, there was a mass outcry, during which residents flooded town hall and speakers broke down into tears expressing their fear. This led to the nondiscrimination ordinance being repealed.

Community organizations stage a number of regionally known annual events, including Sandpoint Winter Carnival in February; the Lost in the 50s vintage car show in May; and the Festival at Sandpoint summer music festival in August. Sandpoint's historic vaudeville-era Panida Theater hosts frequent performing art events and an ongoing independent film series. The Music Conservatory of Sandpoint provides classical music classes and inaugurated its "Little Carnegie" concert hall in 2022. A robust visual arts community supported by the Pend Oreille Arts Council also contributes to Sandpoint's reputation as a center for arts and culture in northern Idaho and the Inland Northwest.

== Geography and climate ==
Sandpoint, Idaho

Climate chart (precipitation, max. and min. temperature)
J	F	M	A	M	J	J	A	S	O	N	D
4.9 32 20	3.1 38 23	2.8 46 28	2.1 57 34	2.3 66 40	2.3 73 46	1 82 49	1.2 81 47	1.7 71 41	2.6 57 34	4.3 42 28	4.6 34 23
- █ Average max. and min. temperatures in °F
- █ Precipitation totals in inches
- Source: NOAA
Metric conversion
J	F	M	A	M	J	J	A	S	O	N	D
123 0 −7	80 3 −5	70 8 −2	53 14 1	59 19 5	57 23 8	25 28 9	30 27 8	43 21 5	67 14 1	109 5 −2	116 1 −5
- █ Average max. and min. temperatures in °C
- █ Precipitation totals in mm

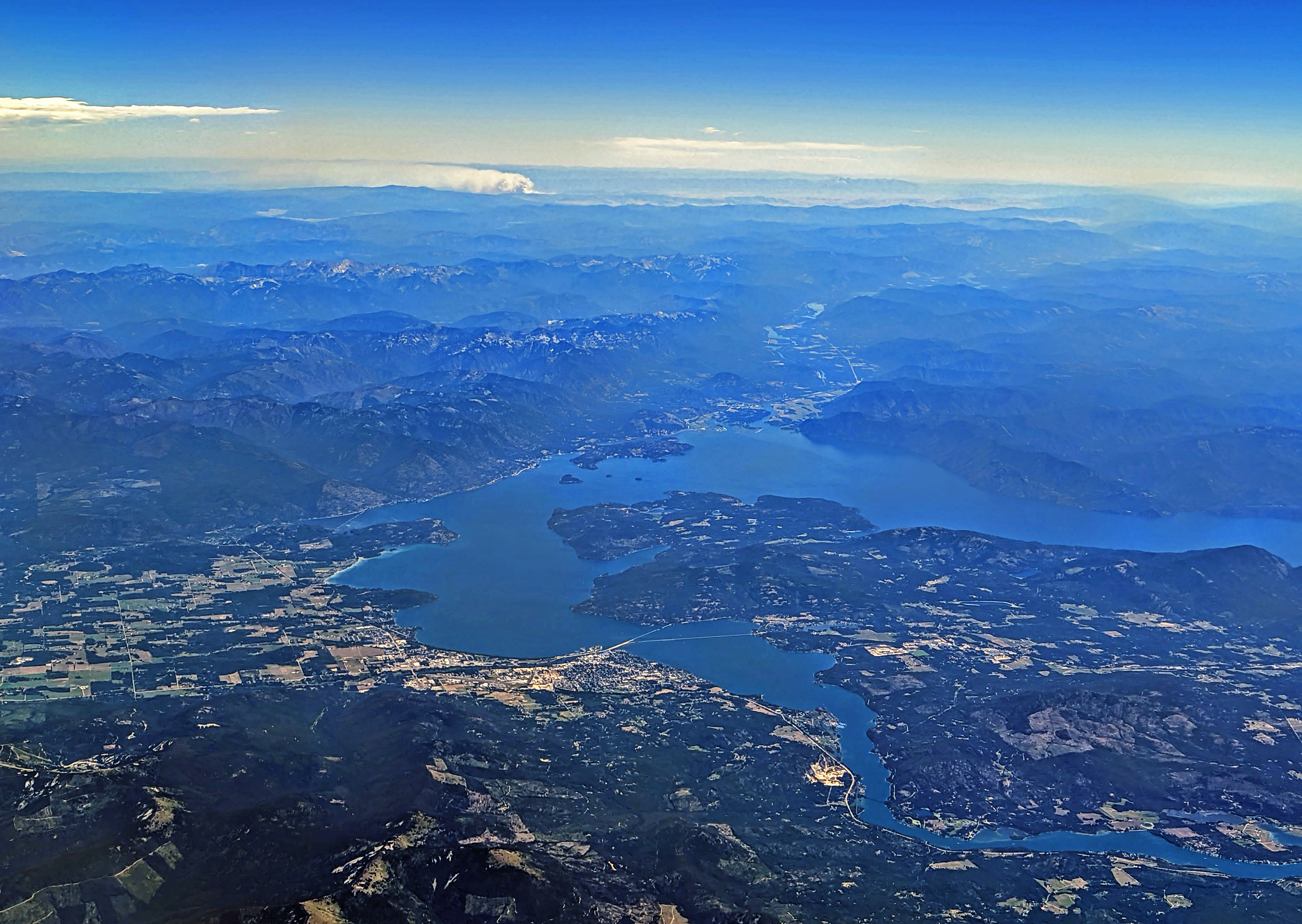
Sandpoint, Idaho, on Lake Pend Oreille, with the August 2022 Elmo fire plume in the background

According to the United States Census Bureau, the city has a total area of 4.79 square miles (12.41 km^{2}), of which 3.98 square miles (10.31 km^{2}) is land and 0.81 square miles (2.10 km^{2}) is water.

Sandpoint has a fairly typical inland Northwestern humid continental climate (Köppen: Dsb), with cold, snowy winters and dry summers with large diurnal temperature swings from hot in the day to very cool at night. The record low was −37 °F (−38 °C) on December 30, 1968, while the record high was 106 °F (41 °C) recorded on June 30, 2021. The wettest month was December 1933 with 11.99 inches (304.5 mm) of total precipitation and the most monthly snowfall 68.8 inches (174.8 cm) in January 1969.

Climate data for Sandpoint, Idaho (Sandpoint Experiment Station) (1991–2020 normals, extremes 1910–present)
Month	Jan	Feb	Mar	Apr	May	Jun	Jul	Aug	Sep	Oct	Nov	Dec	Year
Record high °F (°C)	54 (12)	61 (16)	71 (22)	87 (31)	97 (36)	106 (41)	105 (41)	102 (39)	96 (36)	81 (27)	66 (19)	58 (14)	106 (41)
Mean maximum °F (°C)	45.6 (7.6)	48.3 (9.1)	60.8 (16.0)	72.3 (22.4)	83.6 (28.7)	88.4 (31.3)	95.2 (35.1)	94.8 (34.9)	86.0 (30.0)	72.2 (22.3)	55.3 (12.9)	45.4 (7.4)	96.9 (36.1)
Mean daily maximum °F (°C)	33.6 (0.9)	38.4 (3.6)	46.4 (8.0)	55.6 (13.1)	65.8 (18.8)	71.8 (22.1)	81.8 (27.7)	81.9 (27.7)	71.7 (22.1)	56.3 (13.5)	41.8 (5.4)	33.5 (0.8)	56.6 (13.6)
Daily mean °F (°C)	27.9 (−2.3)	31.1 (−0.5)	37.5 (3.1)	45.0 (7.2)	53.8 (12.1)	59.6 (15.3)	66.7 (19.3)	65.9 (18.8)	57.0 (13.9)	45.2 (7.3)	35.3 (1.8)	27.6 (−2.4)	46.1 (7.8)
Mean daily minimum °F (°C)	22.0 (−5.6)	23.7 (−4.6)	28.6 (−1.9)	34.5 (1.4)	41.8 (5.4)	47.5 (8.6)	51.6 (10.9)	49.8 (9.9)	42.4 (5.8)	34.1 (1.2)	28.9 (−1.7)	21.8 (−5.7)	35.6 (2.0)
Mean minimum °F (°C)	2.8 (−16.2)	7.7 (−13.5)	13.8 (−10.1)	24.6 (−4.1)	30.0 (−1.1)	36.7 (2.6)	41.5 (5.3)	39.9 (4.4)	30.8 (−0.7)	21.0 (−6.1)	14.5 (−9.7)	6.9 (−13.9)	−3.1 (−19.5)
Record low °F (°C)	−31 (−35)	−31 (−35)	−10 (−23)	9 (−13)	22 (−6)	28 (−2)	33 (1)	28 (−2)	16 (−9)	4 (−16)	−10 (−23)	−37 (−38)	−37 (−38)
Average precipitation inches (mm)	4.33 (110)	2.91 (74)	3.58 (91)	2.37 (60)	2.72 (69)	2.44 (62)	1.17 (30)	0.80 (20)	1.41 (36)	2.95 (75)	4.72 (120)	4.61 (117)	34.01 (864)
Average snowfall inches (cm)	20.9 (53)	9.4 (24)	6.5 (17)	0.5 (1.3)	0.0 (0.0)	0.0 (0.0)	0.0 (0.0)	0.0 (0.0)	0.0 (0.0)	0.0 (0.0)	6.4 (16)	19.3 (49)	63 (160.3)
Average extreme snow depth inches (cm)	14.2 (36)	9.0 (23)	6.6 (17)	0.4 (1.0)	0.0 (0.0)	0.0 (0.0)	0.0 (0.0)	0.0 (0.0)	0.0 (0.0)	0.0 (0.0)	3.5 (8.9)	10.9 (28)	19.8 (50)
Average precipitation days (≥ 0.01 in)	15.8	12.3	13.6	11.6	11.3	10.8	5.5	4.7	7.3	11.3	14.2	15.2	133.6
Average snowy days (≥ 0.1 in)	9.2	5.0	3.9	0.6	0.0	0.0	0.0	0.0	0.0	0.1	3.3	9.3	31.4
Source: NOAA

== Demographics ==
Sailboats docked at a private marina

Historical population
Census	Pop.	Note	%±
1910	2,993		—
1920	2,876		−3.9%
1930	3,290		14.4%
1940	4,356		32.4%
1950	4,265		−2.1%
1960	4,355		2.1%
1970	4,144		−4.8%
1980	4,460		7.6%
1990	5,203		16.7%
2000	6,835		31.4%
2010	7,365		7.8%
2020	8,639		17.3%
U.S. Decennial Census 2020

=== 2020 census ===
As of the 2020 census, Sandpoint had a population of 8,639. The median age was 42.3 years. 22.2% of residents were under the age of 18 and 22.6% of residents were 65 years of age or older. For every 100 females there were 90.0 males, and for every 100 females age 18 and over there were 85.9 males age 18 and over.

100.0% of residents lived in urban areas, while 0.0% lived in rural areas.

There were 3,758 households in Sandpoint, of which 27.6% had children under the age of 18 living in them. Of all households, 38.3% were married-couple households, 19.9% were households with a male householder and no spouse or partner present, and 34.4% were households with a female householder and no spouse or partner present. About 36.5% of all households were made up of individuals and 17.4% had someone living alone who was 65 years of age or older.

There were 4,295 housing units, of which 12.5% were vacant. The homeowner vacancy rate was 1.2% and the rental vacancy rate was 8.0%.

Racial composition as of the 2020 census
Race	Number	Percent
White	7,751	89.7%
Black or African American	39	0.5%
American Indian and Alaska Native	62	0.7%
Asian	73	0.8%
Native Hawaiian and Other Pacific Islander	11	0.1%
Some other race	125	1.4%
Two or more races	578	6.7%
Hispanic or Latino (of any race)	360	4.2%

=== Income and poverty ===
The median income between 2016 and 2020 for a household in the city was $46,712. The per capita income for the city was $28,210. The percentage of persons below the poverty line (2016–2020) was 14.7%.

=== Households and housing ===
The median value of owner-occupied housing in the city was $228,800. The homeownership rate (2006–2010) was 49.6%.

=== Education ===
Of the population over 25 years of age (2006–2010), 89.9% had graduated high school, 25.6% had achieved a bachelor's degree or higher.

=== 2010 census ===
As of the census of 2010, there were 7,365 people, 3,215 households, and 1,811 families residing in the city. The population density was 1,850 inhabitants per square mile (714.3/km^{2}). There were 3,769 housing units at an average density of 947 per square mile (365.6/km^{2}). The racial makeup of the city was 95.5% White, 0.1% African American, 0.7% Native American, 0.8% Asian, 0.5% from other races, and 2.2% from two or more races. Hispanic or Latino of any race were 2.9% of the population.

There were 3,215 households, of which 29.3% had children under the age of 18 living with them, 39.4% were married couples living together, 12.3% had a female householder with no husband present, 4.7% had a male householder with no wife present, and 43.7% were non-families. 36.3% of all households were made up of individuals, and 15.1% had someone living alone who was 65 years of age or older. The average household size was 2.20 and the average family size was 2.86.

The median age in the city was 38.8 years. 23.3% of residents were under the age of 18; 8.1% were between the ages of 18 and 24; 26.2% were from 25 to 44; 25.9% were from 45 to 64; and 16.7% were 65 years of age or older. The gender makeup of the city was 48.2% male and 51.8% female.

== Politics ==
Presidential elections results

Previous presidential elections results
Year	Republican	Democratic	Third parties
2020	47.1% 2148	49.9% 2275	3% 138
2016	44.7% 1646	44.3% 1630	11% 406

Statewide elections results

Previous statewide elections results
Year	Republican	Democratic	Third parties
2020 Senate	46.8% 2113	49.8% 2248	3.4% 155
2018 Governor	40.2% 1340	57.8% 1925	2% 65
2018 Lt. Governor	41.9% 1365	58.1% 1890	0% 0
2018 Attorney General	45.5% 1461	54.5% 1750	0% 0
2016 Senate	51.2% 1863	44.5% 1619	4.2% 154

== Economy ==
Since 2002, Sandpoint has been home to aircraft manufacturer Quest Aircraft.

== Education ==
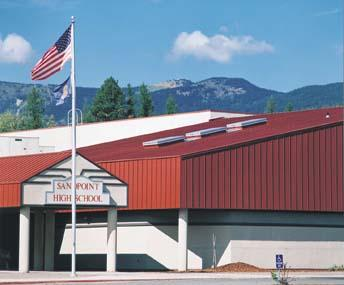
Sandpoint High School

Sandpoint is part of the Lake Pend Oreille School District. Sandpoint High School and Lake Pend Oreille Alternative High School educate students in grades 9 through 12. Forrest Bird Charter School educates grades 6–12.

== Transportation ==
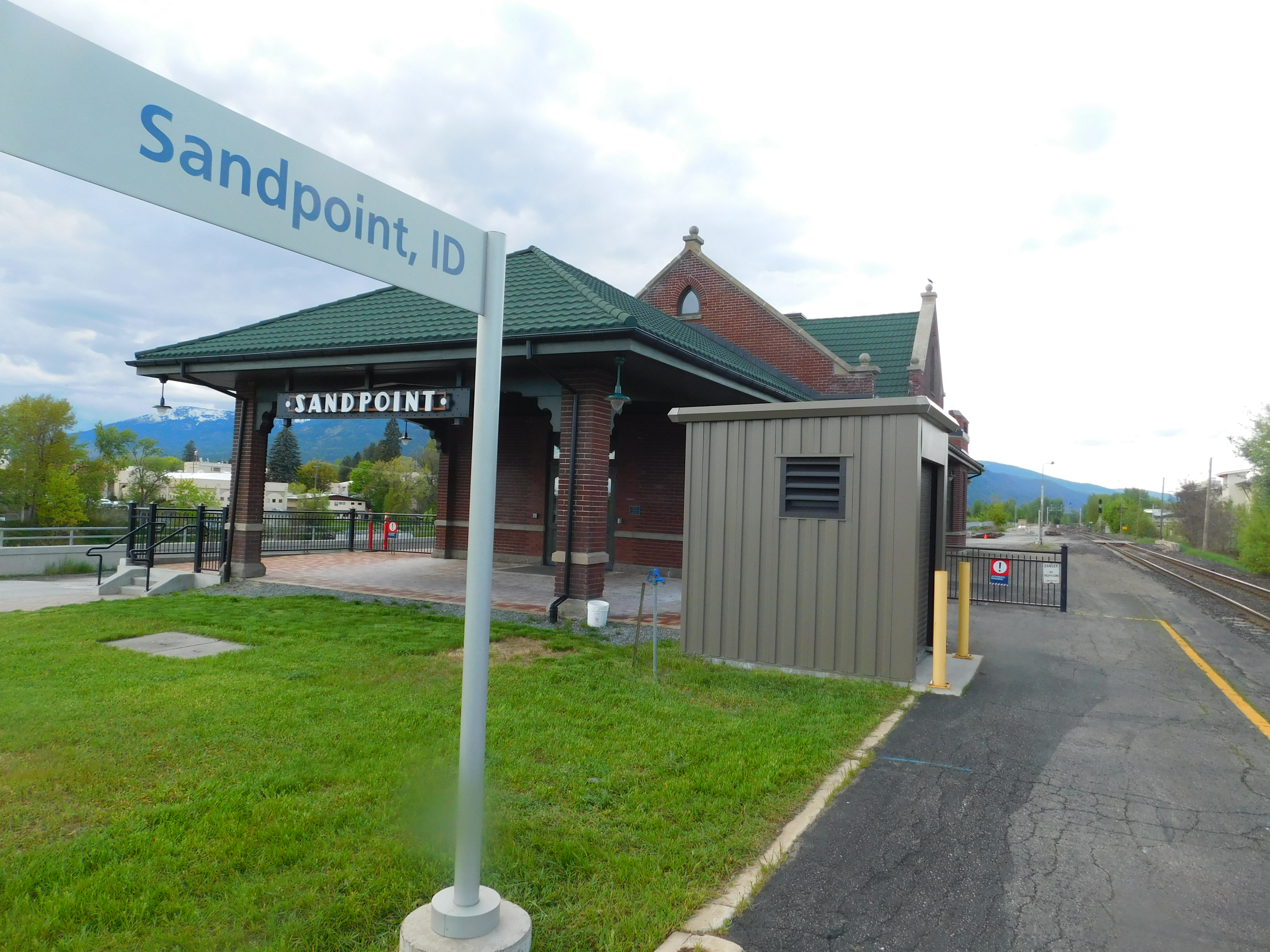
Sandpoint's Amtrak station, served by the Empire Builder

Sandpoint is at the intersection of three major highways that connect the Idaho Panhandle to adjacent states and regions. U.S. Route 95 travels north–south and bypasses downtown Sandpoint using a divided highway on the waterfront; it continues south towards Coeur d'Alene and southern Idaho, and north to the Canadian border. U.S. Route 2 runs through downtown and joins with U.S. Route 95 on its east–west route that connects Spokane, Washington, to northern Montana. State Highway 200 travels on the north side of Lake Pend Oreille towards Thompson Falls, Montana.

Amtrak serves Sandpoint station with daily passenger trains on the Empire Builder, a transcontinental line that begins in Seattle, Washington, and Portland, Oregon, in the west and continues east to Union Station in Chicago, Illinois. Sandpoint station is the only Amtrak station in Idaho. Sandpoint is on the BNSF Railway's Spokane Subdivision, part of the Northern Transcon, and is 80 miles (130 km) by rail northeast of Spokane. Traffic flow was improved in 2023 by paralleling a 2.2-mile (3.5 km) segment including the lake crossing that had been constricted by a single-track bridge.

The local public transit system is operated by the Selkirks–Pend Oreille Transit Authority (SPOT), which began service in June 2011 and has two routes in Sandpoint. SPOT also operates paratransit service and inter-city routes within Bonner and Boundary counties. The agency does not charge a fare for passengers and derives its funding from federal grants and matching funds from the city government.

== Local media ==
Radio

- KSPT AM 1400 (News/Talk)
- KRFY FM 88.5 (Alternative)
- KPND FM 95.3 (Adult Hits)
- KTAQ-LP FM 97.7 (3ABN Radio)
- KIBR FM 102.5 (Country music)
- KTPO FM 106.7 (KPND 95.3 repeater)
- FM 105.3 (Sandpoint's Hit Music)

Television

Television stations serving Sandpoint originate from the Spokane, Washington market:

- KREM 2 (CBS)
- KXLY-TV 4 (ABC)
- KHQ-TV 6 (NBC)
- KSPS-TV 7 (PBS)

Print

- The Bonner County Daily Bee, daily paper since 1965
- The Sandpoint Reader, weekly paper since 2004

== Notable people ==
- Forrest Bird, aviator, biomedical inventor, recipient of Presidential Citizens Medal
- Allie Brosh, humorist blogger and novelist
- Leon Cadore, baseball pitcher who pitched a 26-inning game in 1920; graduate of Sandpoint High School
- John Craigie, folk singer, lived there for a summer and wrote the song "All of July" about Sandpoint
- James C. Fry, United States Army major general, recipient of Distinguished Service Cross
- Mark Fuhrman, former LAPD detective primarily known for his role in the O. J. Simpson murder case
- Tinker Hatfield, athletic shoe designer and Nike Air Jordan architect
- Nate Holland, two-time Olympian, five-time X Games gold medalist, US Snowboard team
- Nell Kruegel Irion, city councilor and first woman to run for Congress in Idaho
- Jerry Kramer, National Football League right guard, author
- Joe Mather, Major League Baseball outfielder
- Patrick F. McManus, outdoor writer and humorist
- Viggo Mortensen, actor and producer
- Alex R. Munson (1941-2025), chief judge of the District Court for the Northern Mariana Islands (1988-2010). He became a resident of Sandpoint after his retirement.
- Don Osborn, former minor league baseball pitcher and manager and pitching coach for the Pittsburgh Pirates
- Kristy Osmunson, singer and fiddle player of the country music duo Bomshel
- Sarah Palin, former governor of Alaska and 2008 Republican nominee for Vice President
- Genevieve Pezet (1913–2009), American artist who lived in France.
- Jake Plummer, former NFL quarterback
- Shook Twins, folk music duo who grew up in Sandpoint
- Lucy Ann Polk, big-band singer
- Marilynne Robinson, writer and winner of the 2005 Pulitzer Prize for Fiction
- Jake Rosholt, mixed martial artist and former collegiate wrestler at Oklahoma State
- Don Samuelson, 25th governor of Idaho (1967−1971)
- Edgar Steele, attorney found guilty of a murder-for-hire plot (from the nearby town of Sagle)
- Ben Stein, writer, lawyer, actor, comedian, and commentator on political and economic issues
- Tim Thomas, retired National Hockey League goaltender
