= Kootenai, Idaho =

- City
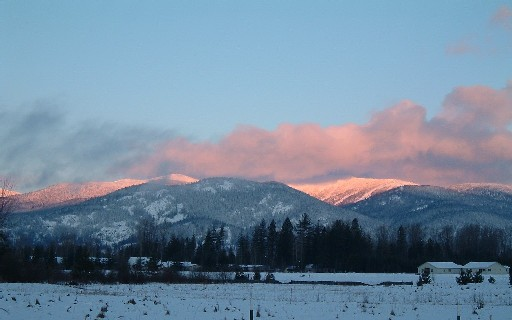
- Sunrise at Kootenai

- Location of Kootenai in Bonner County, Idaho.
- Coordinates: 48°18′43″N 116°31′02″W
- Country: United States
- State: Idaho
- County: Kootenai

Area
  - Total: 0.56 sq mi (1.45 km^{2})
  - Land: 0.56 sq mi (1.45 km^{2})
  - Water: 0 sq mi (0.00 km^{2})
- Elevation: 2,126 ft (648 m)

Population (2020)
  - Total: 941
  - Density: 1,680/sq mi (649/km^{2})
- Time zone: UTC−8 (Pacific (PST))
  - Summer (DST): UTC−7 (PDT)
- ZIP Code: 83840
- Area codes: 208, 986
- FIPS code: 16-44200
- GNIS feature ID: 2411557
- Website: cityofkootenai.org

Kootenai is a city in Bonner County, Idaho. The population was 941 at the 2020 census.

== Geography ==
Kootenai is located at 48°18′38″N 116°30′57″W (48.310650, −116.515816).

According to the United States Census Bureau, the city has a total area of 0.55 square miles (1.42 km^{2}), all of it land.

== Demographics ==
Historical population
Census	Pop.	Note	%±
1920	245		—
1930	199		−18.8%
1940	214		7.5%
1950	199		−7.0%
1960	180		−9.5%
1970	168		−6.7%
1980	280		66.7%
1990	327		16.8%
2000	441		34.9%
2010	678		53.7%
2020	941		38.8%
U.S. Decennial Census

=== 2010 census ===
As of the census of 2010, there were 678 people, 249 households, and 175 families living in the city. The population density was 1,232.7 inhabitants per square mile (475.9/km^{2}). There were 284 housing units at an average density of 516.4 per square mile (199.4/km^{2}). The racial makeup of the city was 95.9% White, 0.3% Native American, 0.4% Asian, and 3.4% from two or more races. Hispanic or Latino of any race were 4.3% of the population.

There were 249 households, of which 41.4% had children under the age of 18 living with them, 54.2% were married couples living together, 12.0% had a female householder with no husband present, 4.0% had a male householder with no wife present, and 29.7% were non-families. Of all households, 22.9% were made up of individuals, and 6.4% had someone living alone who was 65 years of age or older. The average household size was 2.59 and the average family size was 3.06.

The median age in the city was 33.7 years. 27.3% of residents were under the age of 18; 7.5% were between the ages of 18 and 24; 29.6% were from 25 to 44; 23% were from 45 to 64; and 12.7% were 65 years of age or older. The gender makeup of the city was 50.0% male and 50.0% female.

=== 2000 census ===
As of the census of 2000, there were 441 people, 171 households, and 107 families living in the city. The population density was 986.3 inhabitants per square mile (380.8/km^{2}). There were 187 housing units at an average density of 418.2 per square mile (161.5/km^{2}). The racial makeup of the city was 97.51% White, 0.45% Native American, 1.36% from other races, and 0.68% from two or more races. Hispanic or Latino of any race were 1.59% of the population.

There were 171 households, out of which 37.4% had children under the age of 18 living with them, 43.9% were married couples living together, 10.5% had a female householder with no husband present, and 37.4% were non-families. Of all households, 28.1% were made up of individuals, and 5.8% had someone living alone who was 65 years of age or older. The average household size was 2.54 and the average family size was 3.04.

In the city, the population was spread out, with 28.6% under the age of 18, 6.8% from 18 to 24, 32.0% from 25 to 44, 21.1% from 45 to 64, and 11.6% who were 65 years of age or older. The median age was 35 years. For every 100 females, there were 99.5 males. For every 100 females age 18 and over, there were 99.4 males.

The median income for a household in the city was $29,432, and the median income for a family was $38,036. Males had a median income of $32,083 versus $23,750 for females. The per capita income for the city was $13,698. About 12.0% of families and 18.7% of the population were below the poverty line, including 11.0% of those under age 18 and 27.0% of those age 65 or over.
