= 2010 Winter Olympics torch relay route =

The route of the 2010 Winter Olympics torch relay carried the torch through over 1000 communities across Canada, visiting different locations from October 30, 2009, to its final stop at BC Place in Vancouver, British Columbia on February 12, 2010.

== Route in Greece ==
Route in Greece as follows.

October 22
- Olympia
- Pyrgos
- Elis
- Psofida
- Kalavryta
October 23
- Patras
- Missolonghi
- Agrinio
- Karpenisi
October 24
- Lamia
- Karditsa
- Trikala
- Kalabaka
- Metsovo
October 25
- Grevena
- Kastoria
- Florina
- Amyntaio
- Agios Athanasios
- Edessa
October 26
- Serres
- Drama
- Thessaloniki
October 27
- Naousa
- Veria
- Kozani
- Elassona
- Larissa
- Volos
October 28
- Arachova
- Livadeia
- Orchomenus
- Egaleo
- Athens
October 29
- Athens
- Acropolis
- New Acropolis Museum
- Panathenaic Stadium

== Route in Canada ==
Day	Date	Cities	Route length	Notable torchbearers	# of torchbearers
1	Oct 30	British Columbia: Victoria, Esquimalt, CFB Esquimalt, Esquimalt First Nation, Songhees First Nation, View Royal, Sidney, North Saanich, Central Saanich, Saanich, Oak Bay, Victoria		Catriona Le May Doan - long track speed skater Simon Whitfield - triathlete Silken Laumann - rower Alexandre Despatie - diver General Walter Natynczyk - Canadian Chief of the Defence Staff; Allison Forsyth - skier Derek Porter - rower	
2	Oct 31	British Columbia: Victoria, Sooke, T'Sou-ke, Metchosin, Colwood, Fort Rodd Hill, Fisgard Lighthouse, Langford, Mill Bay, Cowichan Bay, Kw'amutsun First Nation, Duncan, North Cowichan, Lake Cowichan, Ganges, Crofton, Chemainus, Ladysmith, Cedar, Snuneymuxw First Nation, Nanaimo			
3	Nov 1	British Columbia: Nanaimo, Lantzville, Nanoose Bay, Parksville, Coombs, Hilliers, Port Alberni, Hupacasath First Nation, Tseshaht First Nation, Ucluelet, Long Beach in Pacific Rim National Park Reserve, Tla-o-qui-aht First Nations, Tofino		Chun Lee-Kyung - short track speed skater	
4	Nov 2	British Columbia: Qualicum Beach, Qualicum First Nation, Qualicum Bay, Bowser, Fanny Bay, Union Bay, Royston, Cumberland, Courtenay, K'ómoks First Nation, Comox, CFB Comox, Black Creek, Campbell River First Nation, Campbell River			
5	Nov 3	British Columbia: Sandspit, Skidegate, Queen Charlotte Yukon: Whitehorse, Kwanlin Dün First Nation British Columbia: Taku River Tlingit First Nation, Atlin Yukon: Whitehorse			
6	Nov 4	Yukon: Dawson City, Old Crow Northwest Territories: Inuvik		Martha Benjamin - cross country skier Alisa Camplin - aerial skier	
7	Nov 5	Nunavut: Kugluktuk Northwest Territories: Dettah, N'Dilo, Yellowknife			
8	Nov 6	Alberta: Grande Prairie, Fort McMurray, CFB Cold Lake, Cold Lake		Kelly Sutherland - chuckwagon racer	
9	Nov 7	Saskatchewan: Lac la Ronge, La Ronge Manitoba: Thompson			
10	Nov 8	Manitoba: Churchill Nunavut: CFS Alert			
11	Nov 9	Nunavut: Grise Fiord, Qausuittuq, Iqaluit		Mary Carillo - sportscaster	
12	Nov 10	Quebec: Kuujjuaq, Gaspé, Uashat-Maliotenam, Sept-Îles			
13	Nov 11	Newfoundland and Labrador: Labrador City, Wabush, CFB Goose Bay, Sheshatshiu, North West River, Happy Valley – Goose Bay			
14	Nov 12	Newfoundland and Labrador: Hopedale, L'Anse aux Meadows, St. Anthony		Bob Cole - sportscaster	
15	Nov 13	Newfoundland and Labrador: Cape Spear, Petty Harbour, Goulds, Conception Bay South, Manuels, Chamberlains, Paradise, Mount Pearl, St. John's		Seamus O'Regan - Co-host of Canada AM; Mike Adam - curler	
16	Nov 14	Newfoundland and Labrador: Carbonear, Harbour Grace, Spaniard's Bay, Bay Roberts, Clarke's Beach, Cupids, Brigus, Clarenville, Glovertown, Gambo, Gander, Lewisporte, Bishop's Falls, Grand Falls-Windsor			
17	Nov 15	Newfoundland and Labrador: Grand Falls-Windsor, Badger, Springdale, Deer Lake, Pasadena, Corner Brook, Port au Port, Kippens, Stephenville, Channel – Port aux Basques			
18	Nov 16	Nova Scotia: North Sydney, Sydney Mines, Membertou, Glace Bay, Dominion, Scotchtown, New Waterford, Sydney, Baddeck, Wagmatcook, Whycocomagh, Waycobah, Mabou, Port Hood, Judique, Port Hawkesbury		Cindy Day - CTV Maritimes meteorologist	
19	Nov 17	Nova Scotia: Port Hawkesbury, Port Hastings, Tracadie, Paq'tnek, Antigonish, New Glasgow, Trenton, Stellarton, Bible Hill, Truro		Will Richardson; Ikue Teshigawara - short track speed skater	
20	Nov 18	Nova Scotia: Truro, Millbrook, Stewiacke, Shubenacadie, Elmsdale, Enfield, Waverley, North Preston, Cherry Brook, Cole Harbour, Dartmouth, Beechville, Halifax		Sidney Crosby - hockey player Sarah Conrad - snowboarder Stephen Giles - canoer/kayaker Sandie Rinaldo - television journalist Andrew Russell - canoer	
21	Nov 19	Nova Scotia: Annapolis Royal, Bear River, Yarmouth			
22	Nov 20	Nova Scotia: Halifax, Lower Sackville, Windsor, Falmouth, Grand-Pré, Wolfville, New Minas, Kentville, Kingston, CFB Greenwood, Middleton, New Germany, Bridgewater, Lunenburg, Halifax		Marci Ien - Canada AM news anchor Lisa Ross - sailing	
23	Nov 21	Nova Scotia: Amherst, Caribou Prince Edward Island Wood Islands, Belfast, Vernon Bridge, Cherry Valley, Pownal, Stratford, Charlottetown			
24	Nov 22	Prince Edward Island: Charlottetown, Cornwall, Winsloe, Hunter River, New Glasgow, Rusticoville, North Rustico, Cavendish, Stanley Bridge, New London, Clinton, Margate, Kensington, Lennox Island, Abrams Village, Wellington, Summerside		Yang Yang - short track speed skater Heather Moyse - bobsledder Cassie Campbell - hockey player	
25	Nov 23	Prince Edward Island: Summerside, Bedeque, Kinkora, Borden-Carleton New Brunswick: Port Elgin, Cap-Pelé, Shediac, Memramcook, Sackville, Dieppe, Moncton		Russ Howard - curler Marc-André LeBlanc - radio host George Gallant - marathon runner	
26	Nov 24	New Brunswick: Moncton, Riverview, Lower Coverdale, Hillsborough, Hopewell Cape, Hopewell Rocks, Riverside-Albert, Alma, Fundy National Park, Sussex Corner, Sussex, Hampton, Quispamsis, Rothesay, Renforth, Saint John		César Cielo Filho - swimmer	
27	Nov 25	New Brunswick: Saint John, Grand Bay–Westfield, Welsford, Oromocto First Nation, Oromocto, CFB Gagetown, Lincoln, St. Mary's First Nation, Fredericton		Marianne Limpert - swimmer	
28	Nov 26	New Brunswick: Not travelling, staying in Fredericton.	n/a	n/a	n/a
29	Nov 27	New Brunswick: Fredericton, Taymouth, Boiestown, Doaktown, Blackville, Newcastle, Miramichi, Douglastown, Esgenoôpetitj, Neguac, Tracadie–Sheila, Shippagan, Caraquet, Grande-Anse, Bathurst		Kathy McCormack - hockey player	
30	Nov 28	New Brunswick: Bathurst, Beresford, Oqpi'kanjik, Dalhousie, Campbellton, Atholville, Kedgwick, Saint-Quentin, Grand Falls, Saint-Léonard, Sainte-Anne-de-Madawaska, Rivière-Verte, Madawaska, Edmundston			
31	Nov 29	New Brunswick: Edmundston, Saint-Jacques Quebec: Dégelis, Notre-Dame-du-Lac, Cabano, Saint-Louis-du-Ha! Ha!, Rivière-du-Loup, Cacouna, L'Isle-Verte, Trois-Pistoles, Saint-Simon, Saint-Fabien, Le Bic, Rimouski			
32	Nov 30	Quebec: Rimouski, Pointe-au-Père, Sainte-Luce, Sainte-Flavie, Mont-Joli, Price, Métis-sur-Mer, Baie-des-Sables, Saint-Ulric, Matane, Baie-Comeau		Ben Mulroney - television host	
33	Dec 1	Quebec: Baie-Comeau, Chute-aux-Outardes, Ragueneau, Pessamit, Forestville, Portneuf-sur-Mer, Longue-Rive, Les Escoumins, Essipit, Sacré-Coeur, Saint-Fulgence, Chicoutimi, Saguenay		Marc Gagnon - short track speed skater Linda Heathcott - equestrian rider	
34	Dec 2	Quebec: Alma, Saint-Cœur-de-Marie, Sainte-Monique-de-Honfleur, Dolbeau-Mistassini, Saint-Félicien, Saint-Prime, Mashteuiatsh, Roberval, Chambord, Desbiens, Métabetchouan–Lac-à-la-Croix, Hébertville, Quebec City			
35	Dec 3	Quebec: CFB Valcartier, Charlesbourg, Les Rivières, Limoilou, Beauport, Lac-Beauport, Wendake, La Haute-Saint-Charles, L'Ancienne-Lorette, Laurentien, Saint-Augustin-de-Desmaures, Sainte-Foy-Sillery, La Cité, Lévis		Gaétan Boucher - long track speed skater	
36	Dec 4	Quebec: Lévis, Montmagny, Lévis, Saint-Romuald, Saint-Jean-Chrysostome, Charny, Saint-Lambert-de-Lauzon, Scott, Sainte-Marie, Vallée-Jonction, Saint-Joseph-de-Beauce, Beauceville, Notre-Dame-des-Pins, Saint-Georges			
37	Dec 5	Quebec: Saint-Prosper-de-Beauce, Saint-Georges, Saint-Benoît-Labre, Saint-Éphrem-de-Beauce, Sainte-Clotilde-de-Beauce, Robertsonville, Thetford Mines, Black Lake, Saint-Ferdinand, Plessisville, Princeville, Victoriaville, Warwick, Danville, Asbestos, Saint-Georges-de-Windsor, Windsor, Lennoxville, Sherbrooke			
38	Dec 6	Quebec: Sherbrooke, Magog, Bromont, Cowansville, Granby, Saint-Dominique, Saint-Hyacinthe, Drummondville, Saint-Léonard-d'Aston, Wôlinak, Bécancour, Trois-Rivières			
39	Dec 7	Quebec: Shawinigan, Nicolet, Odanak, Pierreville, Yamaska, Sorel-Tracy, Varennes, Sainte-Julie, Mont-Saint-Hilaire, Beloeil, McMasterville, Saint-Basile-le-Grand, Saint-Bruno-de-Montarville, Boucherville, Longueuil		Isabelle Brasseur - figure skater	
40	Dec 8	Quebec: Saint-Lambert, Greenfield Park, Longueuil, Brossard, Chambly, Iberville, Saint-Jean-sur-Richelieu, La Prairie, Candiac, Saint-Constant, Kahnawake, Châteauguay, Mercier, Beauharnois, Salaberry-de-Valleyfield, Saint-Lazare, Hudson, Vaudreuil-Dorion, Pincourt, Sainte-Anne-de-Bellevue, Baie-d'Urfé, Beaconsfield		Kristiana Salmon - pole vaulter Bruny Surin - sprinter Jean-Luc Brassard - freestyle skier	
41	Dec 9	Quebec: Mont-Tremblant			
42	Dec 10	Quebec: Montréal-Est, Mascouche, Terrebonne, Bois-des-Filion, Lorraine, Rosemère, Blainville, Sainte-Thérèse, Boisbriand, Sainte-Marthe-sur-le-Lac, Deux-Montagnes, Saint-Eustache, Laval, Dollard-des-Ormeaux, Kirkland, Pointe-Claire, Dorval, Montréal-Ouest, Côte Saint-Luc, Hampstead, Mount Royal, Westmount, Montreal		Jacques Villeneuve - race car driver Sylvie Daigle - short track speed skater Dan Bigras - musician-actor Josée Chouinard - figure skater Yelena Isinbayeva - pole vaulter Pirmin Zurbriggen - skier Barbara Ann Scott - figure skater	
43	Dec 11	Quebec: Repentigny, L'Assomption, Joliette, Crabtree, Saint-Jacques, Saint-Lin-Laurentides, Sainte-Anne-des-Plaines, Mirabel, Saint-Jérôme, Lachute, Grenville Ontario: Hawkesbury Quebec: Montebello, Papineauville, Plaisance, Thurso, Masson-Angers, Buckingham, Gatineau		Mike Fisher - hockey player	
44	Dec 12	Quebec: Aylmer, Hull Ontario: Ottawa		James Duthie - sportscaster Carolyn Waldo - synchronised swimmer	
45	Dec 13	Ontario: Ottawa, Kanata, Carleton Place, Almonte, Arnprior, Renfrew, Douglas, Eganville, Golden Lake, Algonquins of Pikwàkanagàn First Nation, CFB Petawawa, Petawawa, Pembroke		Elizabeth Manley - figure skater	
46	Dec 14	Ontario: Ottawa, Orleans, Rockland, Hammond, Limoges, Casselman, Cornwall, Akwesasne, Morrisburg, Prescott, Brockville, Gananoque, Kingston		Greg Joy - high jumper Anne Jardin - swimmer	
47	Dec 15	Ontario: Kingston, Odessa, Napanee, Tyendinaga, Deseronto, Picton, Belleville, CFB Trenton, Trenton, Brighton, Colborne, Cobourg, Port Hope, Bailieboro, Peterborough			
48	Dec 16	Ontario: Peterborough, Lakefield, Curve Lake First Nation, Bridgenorth, Omemee, Lindsay, Orono, Newcastle, Bowmanville, Courtice, Oshawa			
49	Dec 17	Ontario: Oshawa, Whitby, Ajax, Pickering, Whitchurch–Stouffville, Markham, Richmond Hill, Thornhill, Toronto		Akshay Kumar - actor Karen Kain - ballet Jay Triano - basketball player & coach Roberta Bondar - astronaut Marnie McBean - rower Brian Orser - figure skater Ivan Reitman - film director Jason Reitman - actor Vicky Sunohara - hockey player Ann Rohmer and Melissa Grelo - Canadian television journalists with CP24; Kardinal Offishall - musician Owen von Richter - swimmer Elfi Schlegel - gymnast	
50	Dec 18	Ontario: Toronto, Aurora, Newmarket, Sharon, Keswick, Bradford, Nobleton, Bolton, Nashville, Kleinburg, Vaughan, Brampton		Kurt Browning - figure skater Marilyn Denis - television & radio host	
51	Dec 19	Ontario: Brampton, Norval, Georgetown, Acton, Milton, Mississauga (including Port Credit, Clarkson), Oakville, Burlington, Hamilton		Adam van Koeverden - canoer/kayaker Brian Burke - hockey player & Toronto Maple Leafs executive Kim Yuna - figure skater	
52	Dec 20	Ontario: Hamilton, Stoney Creek, Fruitland, Winona, Grimsby, Beamsville, Vineland, Jordan, St. Catharines, Thorold, Virgil, Niagara-on-the-Lake, Queenston, Niagara Falls		Anna Olson - chef	
53	Dec 21	Ontario: Niagara Falls, Chippawa, Fort Erie, Port Colborne, Welland, Fonthill, Dunnville, Cayuga, Caledonia, Six Nations of the Grand River First Nation, Brantford		Jennifer Hedger - sportscaster	
54	Dec 22	Ontario: Brantford, Paris, Scotland, Simcoe, Delhi, Courtland, Tillsonburg, Aylmer, St. Thomas, Oneida Nation of the Thames, Chippewas of the Thames First Nation, Munsee-Delaware First Nation, Rodney, Ridgetown, Blenheim, Chatham			
55	Dec 23	Ontario: Chatham, North Buxton, Tilbury, Comber, Leamington, Point Pelee National Park, Kingsville, Essex, McGregor, Amherstburg, LaSalle, Windsor		Gordie Howe - hockey player Mike Clemons - football player Stubby Clapp - baseball player	
56	Dec 24	Ontario: Windsor, Tecumseh, Bkejwanong, Corunna, Aamjiwnaang First Nation, Sarnia, Forest, Strathroy, London		Dave Randorf - sportscaster John Davidson - Guinness World Record Holder for fastest crossing of Canada on foot, founder of Jesse's Journey	
57	Dec 25	Ontario: Not travelling, staying in London.	n/a	n/a	n/a
58	Dec 26	Ontario: Not travelling, staying in London.	n/a	n/a	n/a
59	Dec 27	Ontario: London, Thamesford, Ingersoll, Woodstock, Tavistock, Stratford, Shakespeare, New Hamburg, New Dundee, Cambridge, Waterloo, Kitchener		Lisa LaFlamme - television journalist Peter Mansbridge - host of The National (CBC); Jim Balsillie - co-CEO of Research in Motion	
60	Dec 28	Ontario: Kitchener, Guelph, Erin, Alton, Orangeville, Shelburne, Mount Forest, Durham, Hanover, Walkerton, Kincardine, Tiverton, Port Elgin, Southampton, Saugeen, Owen Sound			
61	Dec 29	Ontario: Owen Sound, Meaford, Thornbury, Blue Mountain, Collingwood, Wasaga Beach, Elmvale, Wyebridge, Penetanguishene, Midland, Creemore, Angus, CFB Borden, Alliston, Cookstown, Barrie			
62	Dec 30	Ontario: Barrie, Orillia, Rama, Gravenhurst, Bracebridge, Huntsville, Wasauksing First Nation, Parry Sound, Sundridge, South River, Powassan, North Bay			
63	Dec 31	Ontario: Nipissing, Temagami, Latchford, Cobalt, Haileybury, Temiskaming Shores Quebec: Notre-Dame-du-Nord, Timiskaming First Nation, Évain, Rouyn-Noranda, Cadillac, Malartic, Val-d'Or			
64	Jan 1	Quebec: Val-d'Or, Pikogan, Amos Ontario: Virginiatown, Larder Lake, Kirkland Lake, Matheson, Iroquois Falls, South Porcupine, Timmins		Shania Twain - musician	
65	Jan 2	Ontario: Timmins, Greater Sudbury (through Onaping, Dowling, Chelmsford), Espanola, Massey, Elliot Lake, Blind River, Mississauga First Nation, Thessalon, Ketegaunseebee, Sault Ste. Marie		Alex Baumann - swimmer	
66	Jan 3	Ontario: Sault Ste. Marie, Wawa, White River, Marathon, Terrace Bay, Schreiber, Red Rock (Parmacheene Reserve 53/Lake Helen Reserve 53A), Nipigon, Thunder Bay			
67	Jan 4	Ontario: Fort William First Nation, Thunder Bay, Kakabeka Falls, Upsala, Ignace, Dryden, Vermilion Bay, Wauzhushk Onigum, Kenora			
68	Jan 5	Ontario: Kenora, Keewatin, Iskatewizaagegan 39 Manitoba: Falcon Lake, Richer, Ste. Anne, Steinbach, Dugald, Oakbank, Selkirk, Winnipeg			
69	Jan 6	Manitoba: Gimli, Peguis First Nation, St. Laurent			
70	Jan 7	Manitoba: Winnipeg, Oak Bluff, Sanford, Brunkild, Carman, Roland, Winkler, Morden, Elm Creek, Oakville, Portage la Prairie		Eddie "The Eagle" Edwards - ski jumper	
71	Jan 8	Manitoba: Dakota Tipi, Portage la Prairie, Long Plain First Nation, Gladstone, Neepawa, Minnedosa, Forrest Station, CFB Shilo, Brandon			
72	Jan 9	Manitoba: Brandon, Sioux Valley Dakota, Virden Saskatchewan: Moosomin, Yorkton, Melville, Fort Qu'Appelle, Regina			
73	Jan 10	Saskatchewan: Regina, CFB Moose Jaw, Moose Jaw, Caronport, Mortlach, Morse, Herbert, Swift Current			
74	Jan 11	Saskatchewan: Swift Current, Kyle, Elrose, Rosetown, Delisle, Vanscoy, Saskatoon, Wanuskewin Heritage Park, Warman, Osler, Hague, Rosthern, Duck Lake, Prince Albert		Philippe Candeloro - figure skater	
75	Jan 12	Saskatchewan: Prince Albert, Shellbrook, Leask, Blaine Lake, Hafford, North Battleford, Battleford, Moosomin First Nation, Saulteaux First Nation, Cochin, Maidstone, Lashburn, Marshall, Lloydminster			
76	Jan 13	Alberta: Lloydminster, Kitscoty, Vermilion, St. Paul, Vegreville, Sherwood Park, Fort Saskatchewan, Namao, St. Albert, Edmonton		Pat Quinn - hockey player & coach	
77	Jan 14	Alberta: Edmonton (Rexall Place)	31m	Donald Gauf - hockey player Billy Dawe - hockey player Shannon Szabados - hockey player Meaghan Mikkelson - hockey player	5
78	Jan 15	Alberta: Stony Plain, Spruce Grove, Enoch, Devon, Beaumont, Leduc, Camrose, Wetaskiwin, Hobbema, Ponoka, Lacombe, Sylvan Lake, Red Deer			
79	Jan 16	Alberta: Innisfail, Bowden, Olds, Torrington, Trochu, Three Hills, Drumheller, Rosedale, Hoodoos, Siksika First Nation, Gleichen, Brooks, Ralston, CFB Suffield, Redcliff, Medicine Hat			
80	Jan 17	Alberta: Medicine Hat, Seven Persons, Bow Island, Burdett, Grassy Lake, Taber, Coaldale, Coalhurst, Lethbridge		Jill Quirk - swimmer Mark Tewksbury - swimmer	
81	Jan 18	Alberta: Kainai First Nation, Fort Macleod, Head-Smashed-In Buffalo Jump, Granum, Claresholm, Stavely, Nanton, High River, Okotoks, Calgary		Kyle Shewfelt - gymnast Jim "Bearcat" Murray - former trainer of the Calgary Flames "Jungle" Jim Hunter - skier Kathy Salmon - luge Gail Amundrud - swimmer	
82	Jan 19	Alberta: Calgary, Chestermere, Strathmore, Irricana, Beiseker, Crossfield, Airdrie		Shawn Johnson - gymnast Susan Auch - long track speed skater Kristina Groves - long track speed skater Anna Maria Kaufmann - opera singer Curtis Myden - swimmer Stephen Ames - golfer Diane Jones-Konihowski - athletics Frank King -1988 Winter Olympics organizer	
83	Jan 20	Alberta: Calgary, Canada Olympic Park, Springbank, Cochrane, Stoney First Nation, Nakiska, Exshaw, Canmore, Banff		Karen Percy-Lowe - skier	
84	Jan 21	Alberta: Banff, Lake Louise, Kicking Horse Pass British Columbia: Field, Golden		Peter Lougheed - former Alberta Premier; Wally Buono - football player & coach	
85	Jan 22	British Columbia: Golden, Nicholson, Parson, Edgewater, Kootenay National Park, Radium Hot Springs, Shuswap First Nation, Invermere, Windermere, Akisq'nuk First Nation, Fairmont Hot Springs, Canal Flats, Kimberley, Marysville, Cranbrook			
86	Jan 23	British Columbia: Elkford, Sparwood, Fernie, Cranbrook, Moyie, Yahk, Kitchener, Erickson, Creston, Kootenay Pass, Salmo, Ymir, Nelson			
87	Jan 24	British Columbia: Nelson, Shoreacres, Tarry's, Robson, Castlegar, Genelle, Fruitvale, Beaver Falls, Montrose, Trail, Warfield, Rossland, Christina Lake, Grand Forks, Greenwood, Midway, Rock Creek, Osoyoos		Mark Johnston - swimmer	
88	Jan 25	British Columbia: Osoyoos First Nation, Osoyoos, Oliver, Okanagan Falls, Kaleden, Penticton, Penticton First Nation, Summerland, Peachland, West Kelowna, Westbank First Nation, Kelowna		Ye Qiaobo - long track speed skater Ross Rebagliati - snowboarder Scott Frandsen - rower Terry David Mulligan - actor and television personality	
89	Jan 26	British Columbia: Kelowna, Lake Country, Coldstream, Vernon, Spallumcheen, Armstrong, Enderby, Grindrod, Sicamous, Malakwa, Revelstoke		Dylan Armstrong - shot-putter	
90	Jan 27	British Columbia: Revelstoke, Craigellachie, Canoe, Salmon Arm, Sexqeltqin First Nation, Tappen, Blind Bay, Sorrento, Chase, Pritchard, Kamloops		Mark Recchi - hockey player Nancy Greene - skier Farhan Lalji - sportscaster Michael Farrington - figure skater Kate Richardson - gymnast	
91	Jan 28	British Columbia: Kamloops, Tk'emlups First Nation, Barriere, Clearwater, Little Fort, Lone Butte, 100 Mile House, 108 Mile Ranch, Lac La Hache, 150 Mile House, Williams Lake Indian Band, Williams Lake			
92	Jan 29	British Columbia: Williams Lake, Kersley, Lhtako, Quesnel, Hixon, Prince George, Valemount, McBride, Prince George			
93	Jan 30	British Columbia: Prince George, Mackenzie, Fort St. James, Nak'azdli First Nation, Vanderhoof, Fort Fraser, Fraser Lake, Stellat'en First Nation, Burns Lake, Lake Babine, Topley, Houston, Telkwa, Smithers, Moricetown, New Hazelton, Hagwilget Village First Nation, Gitanmaax First Nation, Hazelton			
94	Jan 31	British Columbia: Dawson Creek, Tumbler Ridge, Chetwynd, Saulteau First Nations, Hudson's Hope, Fort St. John			
95	Feb 1	British Columbia: Fort Nelson First Nation, Fort Nelson, Haisla First Nation, Kitimat, Terrace, Kitsumkalum First Nation, New Aiyansh, Prince Rupert			
96	Feb 2	British Columbia: Bella Bella, Gwa'Sala-'Nakwaxda'xw First Nation, Port Hardy			
97	Feb 3	British Columbia: Kwakiutl First Nation, Port Hardy, Port McNeill, Sliammon First Nation, Powell River			
98	Feb 4	British Columbia: Powell River, Saltery Bay Provincial Park, Earls Cove, Pender Harbour, Madeira Park, Sechelt, Shishalh First Nation, Roberts Creek, Gibsons, Hopkins Landing, Langdale, Lions Bay, Furry Creek, Britannia Beach, Stawamus, Squamish			
99	Feb 5	British Columbia: Squamish, Brackendale, Whistler Olympic Park, Whistler		Don Taylor - sportscaster Michael Landsberg - sportscaster Matthew Pinsent - rower Steve Podborski - skier Valerie Pringle - television host and journalist	
100	Feb 6	British Columbia: Whistler, Pemberton, Lil'wat First Nation, Shalalth, Sekw'el'was First Nation, Lillooet, Xaxli'p First Nation, Ts'kw'aylaxw First Nation, St'uxwtews First Nation, Cache Creek, Ashcroft, Logan Lake, Scw'exmx First Nation, Merritt			
101	Feb 7	British Columbia: Merritt, Princeton, Hope, Seabird Island First Nation, Harrison Hot Springs, Agassiz, Rosedale, Chilliwack, Abbotsford			
102	Feb 8	British Columbia: Mission, Maple Ridge, Pitt Meadows, Walnut Grove, Fort Langley, Aldergrove, Langley (Township), Langley, Cloverdale, Surrey		Daniel Igali - wrestler Steve Armitage - sportscaster	
103	Feb 9	British Columbia: Surrey, White Rock, Peace Arch Provincial Park; Washington, United States: Blaine, Peace Arch State Park; British Columbia: North Delta, New Westminster, Tsawwassen, Tsawwassen First Nation, Ladner, Richmond		Adam Loewen - professional baseball player	
104	Feb 10	British Columbia: Bowen Island, Horseshoe Bay, Xwemelch'stn-Capilano Indian Reserve, North Vancouver, Tsleil-Waututh First Nation, North Vancouver (District), West Vancouver		Dick Pound - former IOC vice president Julie Payette - astronaut Victor Kraatz - figure skater	
105	Feb 11	British Columbia: Belcarra, Anmore, Port Moody, Port Coquitlam, Coquitlam, Burnaby, Musqueam First Nation, University of British Columbia, Vancouver		Bob Costas - sportscaster Matt Lauer - host of NBC Today; Justin Morneau - first baseman, Minnesota Twins; Michael Bublé - singer/songwriter Jann Arden - singer/songwriter Tracy Wilson - figure skating Sarah McLachlan - singer/songwriter Steve Nash - basketball player, point guard Phoenix Suns; Trevor Linden - former Vancouver Canucks captain	
106	Feb 12	British Columbia: Vancouver (BC Place)		Beckie Scott - cross country skier Arnold Schwarzenegger - California governor Walter Gretzky - father of Wayne Gretzky; Stan Smyl - former Vancouver Canucks captain Richard Brodeur - former Canucks goaltender Charmaine Crooks - athletics Elaine Lui - television personality Rolly Fox - father of cancer research champion Terry Fox; Sebastian Coe - athlete, chairman of the 2012 Summer Olympics organizing committee	

== See also ==
- 2008 Summer Olympics torch relay route
