= Ktunaxa Nation =

First Nations government in British Columbia, Canada

The Ktunaxa Nation or Ktunaxa Nation Council is a First Nations tribal council government comprising four Ktunaxa (Kutenai) bands in the south-east of the Canadian province of British Columbia. It is one of three Kutenai governments, the others being the Kootenai Tribe of Idaho and the Confederated Salish and Kootenai Tribes in the United States.

The Ktunaxa Nation also includes descendants of the Kinbasket family, a Secwepemc (Shuswap) band who settled in Ktunaxa Nation territory and became members. Secwepemc citizens formed the Shuswap Indian Band, now part of the Shuswap Nation Tribal Council.

The council was formed in 1970 as the Kootenay Indian District Council. The name was changed in 1990 to the Ktunaxa/Kinbasket Tribal Council to reflect the presence both Kutenai and Secwepemc citizens in the council. In 2005, the named was changed to Ktunaxa Nation Council following the departure of the Shuswap Indian Band.

== History ==
In May 2018, they became a signatory to the Buffalo Treaty.

== Member Communities ==
- Ɂakisq̓nuk First Nation, Windermere
- Lower Kootenay First Nation, Creston
- ʔaq̓am First Nation, Cranbrook
- Yaq̓it ʔa·knuqⱡi’it First Nation, Grasmere

== See also ==
- List of tribal councils in British Columbia
- Kutenai language
