= List of Montana Wildlife Management Areas =

List of Montana Wildlife Management Areas is a list of protected areas in the US state of Montana. The list can include conservation areas, wildlife management areas, and state parks.

== Wildlife Management Areas ==
- Amelia Island WMA: 191 acres (77 ha)
- Aunt Molly WMA: 1,183 acres (479 ha)
- Bad Rock Canyon WMA: 1,200 acres (490 ha). A consortium of partners initiated by Flathead Land Trust, with the final title to Montana Fish, Wildlife, and Parks, to own and manage.
- Bear Creek WMA: 3,468 acres (1,403 ha).
- Beartooth WMA: 35,174 acres (14,234 ha). Established in 1970 and borders the Missouri River.
- Beckman WMA: 6,639 acres (2,687 ha).
- Bighorn Viewing Site WMA: 49 acres (20 ha).
- Big Lake WMA: 3,371.10 acres (1,364.24 ha).
- Big Snowy Mountains WMA: 5,670.05 acres (2,294.59 ha).
- Blackfoot-Clearwater WMA: 29,342.58 acres (11,874.52 ha).
- Blackleaf WMA: 10,754 acres (4,352 ha).
- Blacktail WMA: 17,964 acres (7,270 ha).
- Blue Eyed Nellie WMA: 10,754 acres (4,352 ha).
- Bull River WMA: 1,576 acres (638 ha).
- Calf Creek WMA: 2,416 acres (978 ha).
- Canyon Creek WMA: 3,314.80 acres (1,341.45 ha)
- Canyon Ferry WMA: 5,920.26 acres (2,395.84 ha).
- Cree Crossing WMA: 398 acres (161 ha).
- Dodson Creek WMA: 54 acres (22 ha).
- Dodson Dam WMA: 704 acres (285 ha).
- Dome Mountain WMA: 5,016.99 acres (2,030.30 ha).
- Ear Mountain WMA: 3,053.11 acres (1,235.55 ha).
- Elk Island WMA: 1,700.53 acres (688.18 ha).
- Fish Creek WMA: 36,101.29 acres (14,609.67 ha).
- Fleecer Mountain WMA: 7,590.97 acres (3,071.96 ha)
- Fox Lake WMA: 1,657 acres (671 ha)
- Fresno Reservoir WMA: 2,742 acres (1,110 ha).
- Freezout Lake WMA: 11,333 acres (4,586 ha).
- Full Curl WMA: 440 acres (180 ha).
- Gallatin WMA: 8,641 acres (3,497 ha).
- Garrity Mountain WMA: 10,832.94 acres (4,383.94 ha).
- Grant Marsh WMA: 536.99 acres (217.31 ha).
- Haymaker WMA: 1,334 acres (540 ha).
- Hinsdale WMA: 262 acres (106 ha).
- Isaac Homestead WMA: 1,263 acres (511 ha).
- Judith River WMA: 9,397 acres (3,803 ha)
- Kootenai Falls WMA: 172 acres (70 ha).
- Kootenai West WMA: 921.34 acres (372.85 ha).
- Kootenai Woods Ranch WMA: 1,484 acres (601 ha).
- Lake Helena WMA: 431 acres (174 ha).
- Lost Creek WMA: 1,405 acres (569 ha).
- Lost River WMA: 3,055 acres (1,236 ha).
- Marias River WMA: 7,772 acres (3,145 ha).
- Marshall Creek WMA: 24,798 acres (10,035 ha).
- Mount Haggin WMA: 60,028.87 acres (24,292.82 ha). Historic range of the Kootenai, Pend d'Oreilles, and Salish Indians.
- Mount Jumbo WMA: 118 acres (48 ha).
- Mount Silcox WMA: 1,535 acres (621 ha).
- Nevada Lake WMA: 1,523 acres (616 ha).
- Ninepipe WMA: 4,147 acres (1,678 ha).
- North Shore WMA: 426 acres (172 ha).
- North Swan Valley WMA: 1,886 acres (763 ha).
- Pablo WMA: 195 acres (79 ha).
- Ray Kuhns WMA: 1,557 acres (630 ha).
- Robb-Ledford WMA: 28,235.71 acres (11,426.59 ha).
- Rookery WMA: 2,293 acres (928 ha).
- Roundhorn WMA: 27 acres (11 ha).
- Seven Sisters WMA: 1,554 acres (629 ha).
- Silver Run WMA: 651 acres (263 ha).
- Sleeping Buffalo WMA: 1,315 acres (532 ha).
- Smith River WMA: 3,367 acres (1,363 ha).
- Spotted Dog WMA: 37,690.30 acres (15,252.72 ha).
- Spring Coulee WMA: 1,056 acres (427 ha).
- Sun River WMA: 19,745 acres (7,991 ha).
- Threemile WMA: 6,430 acres (2,600 ha)
- Vandalia WMA: 403.62 acres (163.34 ha).
- Wall Creek WMA: 7,708 acres (3,119 ha).
- Warm Springs WMA: 1,338 acres (541 ha).
- Yellowstone WMA: 4,407 acres (1,783 ha).
