= Shuswap =

Shuswap /ˈʃuːʃwɑːp/ may refer to:

- Secwepemc, an indigenous people in British Columbia, Canada, also known in English as the Shuswap
  - Shuswap Nation Tribal Council, a multi-band regional organization of Secwepemc governments based in Kamloops, British Columbia
  - Northern Shuswap Tribal Council, a.k.a. the Cariboo Tribal Council, a multi-band regional organization of Secwepemc governments based in Williams Lake, British Columbia
  - Shuswap Indian Band, a.k.a. the Shuswap First Nation, a member government of the Shuswap Nation Tribal Council and the Ktunaxa Kinbasket Tribal Council
  - Shuswap Indian Reserve, an Indian reserve located in Invermere, British Columbia, under the jurisdiction of the Shuswap Indian Band
  - Shuswap, British Columbia, a locality adjacent to and including that Indian reserve
- Shuswap language, a language spoken by the Secwepemc
- Shuswap River, a river in the Monashee Mountains and North Okanagan of British Columbia
- Shuswap Country, a region in the interior of British Columbia, often called simply "the Shuswap"
- Shuswap Lake, a lake that is the core of the same region
- Shuswap Lake Provincial Park, a provincial park in British Columbia
- Shuswap (provincial electoral district), an electoral district, represented in the Legislative Assembly of British Columbia
- Shuswap-Revelstoke, a defunct electoral district in British Columbia, 1966–1986
- Columbia-Shuswap Regional District, a regional district government in British Columbia
