= Shuswap Indian Reserve =

Coordinates: 50°32′00″N 116°02′00″W

The Shuswap Indian Reserve is a First Nations reserve in the Columbia Valley region of British Columbia, Canada, located on the left bank of the Columbia River, one mile (1.6 km) north of Invermere. The reserve is the home reserve of the Shuswap Indian Band (Kenpésq't), a band government of the Secwepemc (Shuswap) people and a member of the Shuswap Nation Tribal Council. The band was formerly a member of the Ktunaxa Kinbasket Tribal Council, in alliance with the neighbouring Ktunaxa bands with whom the community has long intermarried; it left around 2005, after which that council renamed itself the Ktunaxa Nation Council.

== See also ==
- List of Indian Reserves in Canada
