= Lower Kootenay Band =

First Nation government

Lower Kootenay
- Band No. 606
- Yaqan nuʔkiy
- Map Location of Lower Kootenay Band
- People: Kutenai
- Headquarters: Creston
- Province: British Columbia

Land
- Other reserves: List: Creston 1; Lower Kootenay 1A; Lower Kootenay 1C; Lower Kootenay 2; Lower Kootenay 3; Lower Kootenay 4; Lower Kootenay 5; St. Mary's 1A
- Land area: 32.5 km^{2} (12.5 sq mi)

Population (2025)
- On reserve: 110
- On other land: 12
- Off reserve: 133
- Total population: 255

Government
- Chief: M. Jason Louie
- Council: 2022-2026: Robin Louie; Chad Luke; Leona Basil; Cherie Luke

Tribal Council
- Ktunaxa Nation

Website
- lowerkootenay.com

The Lower Kootenay First Nation (Ktunaxa: Yaqan nuʔkiy) is a First Nation based in the East Kootenay region of British Columbia. In the British Columbia Treaty Process they are part of the Ktunaxa Kinbasket Tribal Council.

== Treaty process ==
The Ktunaxa Nation entered Stage 5 of the BC Treaty Process in 2017.

== History ==
The Lower Kootenay Tribe, known as the Yaqan Nukiy, is part of the Ktunaxa Nation. The Ktunaxa Nation consists of six different Bands, four located in British Columbia and two in the United States. The four bands located in British Columbia are referred to as bands, while the two bands in the United States are referred to as tribes. The Band name Yaqan Nukiy directly translates to "where the rock stands". The land that belongs to the Ktunaxa Nation encompasses all of the south-eastern part of British Columbia along the Kootenay River also known as the Creston Valley. The land itself is 27,000 square miles (70,000 km^{2}), and that included some states in the United States. The near proximity to the Kootenay river not only provides their name, but also differentiates them from the Upper Kootenay band which consists of forest and mountains than rivers and lakes.

== Geography ==
The Yaqan Nukiy band is located along the Kootenay River. The proximity of the lake and the river were able to determine what type of lifestyle the Yaqan Nukiy band would have. The Yaqan Nukiy band became depended on hunting, gathering and fishing to survive. The river was used a main water source, and became useful in ritual practices. The Yaqan Nukiy alone have 6,000 acres of substantial agricultural land. Their life on the water determined the type of transportation they had. The Yaqan Nukiy created canoes called the sturgeon-nosed canoes that were light and pointed downward, and they were attributed to the First Nations as the first of its kind.

Due to the nature of the Kootenay River crossing into the borders of the United States, it created conflict between the United States and Canada.

Pollution, climate change and many other factors have drastically changed the ecosystems of these areas. In 2018, the Yaqan Nukiy have been working to restore 517 hectares (1,280 acres) of wetland located on reserve land by removing dikes and reconnecting waterways. As of June 2025, more than 2 kilometres (1.2 mi) of dikes have been removed. The band has also released millions of burbot larvae into the area using Canadian brood stock.

== Government ==
The Yaqan Nukiy band consist of one chief and four councillors. The chief of the Yaqan Nukiy as of 2022 is Chief Jason Louie. The people of the Yaqan Nukiy band vote for their people in office.

Like many other tribes the Yaqan Nukiy has entered many agreements and never signed a single treaty with any government. The Ktunaxa Nation has never signed a treaty. The fifth stage of negotiation is one of the last stages which establishes the relationship between the tribe and the government.

== Culture ==
Much of the culture of the Yaqan Nukiy band is heavily influenced by their location. Since they were located near the river, it became part of their culture. It determined what they ate which was various different types of fish, for example; kokanee bull trout, burbot, and sturgeon.

=== Yaksumit ===
The sturgeon-canoes also known as the Yaksumit, were made with materials that were available to the Yaqan Nukiy on their land. Most of the sturgeon-canoes were made from bark, however when the Europeans arrived on the bands land they were exposed to a different type of material that would become more common, canvas.

=== Spirituality ===
The Yaqan Nukiy's religion is heavily based on spirituality, and a traditional way to heal, purify and pray is through the creation of a sweatlodge. The sweatlodge ceremony is very common amongst First Nations, and is used as a purification and healing ceremony. The way in which the sweatlodge is created is first a fire is specifically made to heat up the rocks that will be used in the ceremony, then in the middle of where the sweatlodge will be built a pit will be created to hold the rocks and create the steam that will be trapped inside the sweatlodge causing people inside to sweat. The sweatlodge itself is a dome made of sticks and covered, that entraps the steam and the people of the First Nations enter naked or with very light clothing, and begin the ceremony which can last a whole night. After the ceremony is completed there is a feast held by the family of the person who hosted the sweatlodge ceremony.

=== Housing ===
The teepee was the most common form of housing amongst the First Nation people, and its creation included four poles and tule, tule was most accessible to the Yaqan Nukiy people because they were closer to the river. The Yaqan Nukiy band also had different forms of teepees for the seasons, they had a lighter teepee for the summers which were easy to breakdown, and a heavier base teepee for the winters.

== Language ==
The language of the Yaqan Nukiy band is almost extinct, due to the establishments of residential schools in Canada. They speak Kutenai which is a language isolate.

== Education ==
=== Yaqan Nukiy School ===
A school on the Yaqan Nukiy land which goes from pre-kindergarten to grade eight. It is a small school that has ninety-three students, and has a class that teaches the students about Ktunaxa language and culture.

=== Kootenay River Secondary School ===
This school is located on the east side of the Kootenay river and is from grades eighth to twelfth grade and it has about 500 students.

=== Residential school history ===
In July 2021, ground-penetrating radar discovered the unmarked graves of 182 people at the site of the former St. Eugene's Mission School located on the reserve. Students from this band and others were required by law to attend the school until it closed in the 1970s.

== Demographics ==
The Lower Kootenay First Nation has 208 members.
