= St. Eugene Golf Resort and Casino =

Coordinates: 49.5860°N 115.7572°W

St. Eugene Golf Resort and Casino is a golf course and casino in British Columbia, notable for being a former Indian residential school converted to a Native-owned casino.

The resort is located on plain of the St. Mary's River, between the Rockies and the Purcell Mountains near Cranbrook, British Columbia.

== History ==
The Kootenay Indian Residential School (composed of the St. Eugene's and St. Mary's schools), run by the Oblates of Mary Immaculate of the Roman Catholic Church, was opened in 1912, operated at the 1897-built St. Eugene Church, and closed in 1970. Between 1912 and 1970, over 5,000 children have attended the school. The school remained closed for the following decades.

After renovating the building, St. Eugene Golf Course opened in 2000, followed by Casino of the Rockies in 2002, and the St. Eugene Hotel in 2003.

The resort underwent a multi-million renovation that was completed in July 2019.

Ground penetrating radar located 182 suspected unmarked graves in the community's cemetery which is adjacent to the former St. Eugene Residential School. In a June 30, 2021 press release, the Leadership of ʔaq̓am, a First Nations community part of the Ktunaxa Nation, indicated that unmarked graves can occur due to deterioration of wooden crosses that had traditionally been used to mark graves; the Leadership also indicated that: "it is extremely difficult to establish whether or not these unmarked graves contain the remains of children who attended the St. Eugene Residential School." In a media release from the Lower Kootenay Band, also a member of the Ktunaxa Nation, Chief Jason Louis stated that "It is believed that the remains of these 182 souls are from the member bands of the Ktunaxa Nation, neighbouring First Nations communities and the community of ʔaq̓am."

== Property ==
The resort has a golf course, a casino, two restaurants, a bar, and a spa.

The 3-story St. Eugene Hotel has 125 rooms and suites. It is ranked by the AAA as a Three Diamond Hotel.

Casino of the Rockies has 210 slot machines for E-Roulette, E-Baccarat and E-Blackjack, and four table games.

The 18-hole golf course is designed by Les Furber.

== Ownership ==
In an unusual case in Canada, the resort was once part-owned by three distant bands, the Samson Cree Nation of Maskwacis, Alberta, the Chippewas of Rama First Nation, of Rama, Ontario, in addition to the Ktunaxa Nation The Ktunaxa Nation regained the whole ownership of the resort in 2017, which it had held originally between 2000–2003.

== See also ==
- List of golf courses in Canada
- List of casinos in Canada
