= Sturgeon-nosed canoe =

Type of boat

The sturgeon-nosed canoe, also known as a Kootenay Canoe or Kootenay-nosed Canoe (Ktunaxa: yaqsuʔmiⱡ), is a distinctive canoe style used by the Sinixt, Ktunaxa and Kalispel First Nations in Interior British Columbia and the Pacific Northwest.

== History and design ==
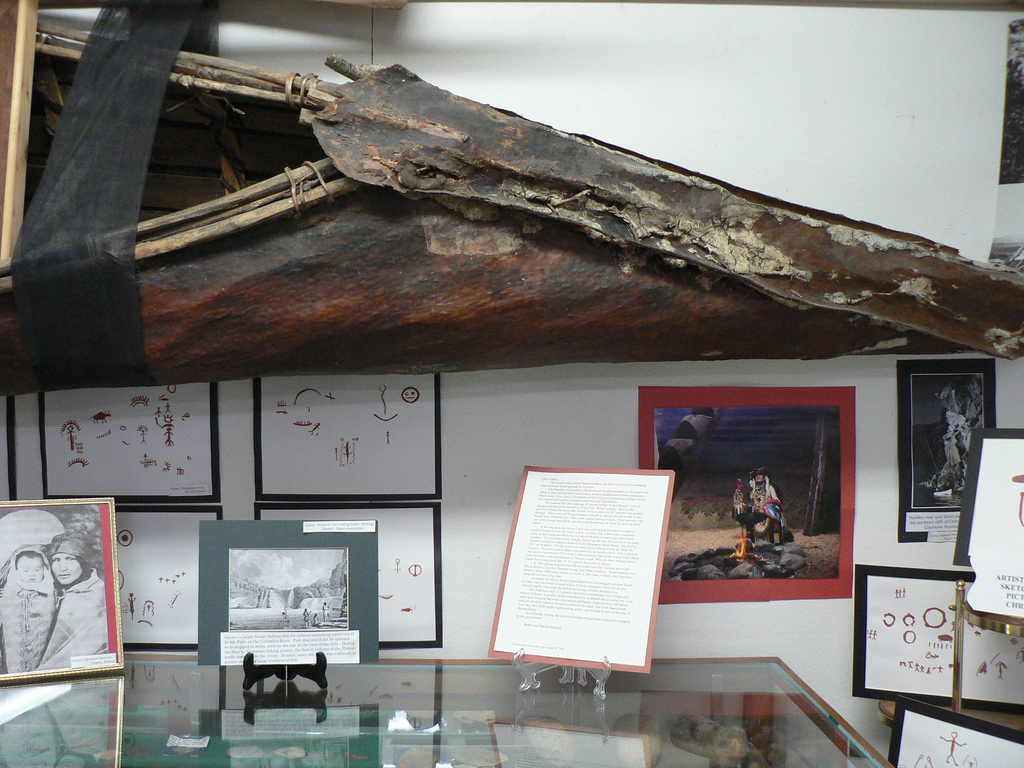
In the Nakusp Museum, Nakusp, British Columbia

Scottish botanist David Douglas, the first scientific traveller to visit the Arrow Lakes, wrote about the Sinixt People in his 1827 journal:

The canoes of the natives here are different in form from any I have seen before ... The under part is made of the fine bark of Pine (Pinus canadensis) and about one foot from the gunwale of birch-bark, sewed with the roots of Cedar (Thuya) and the seams neatly gummed with resin from the pine. They are 10 to 14 ft long, terminating at both ends sharply and bent inwards so much at the mouth that a man of middle size has some difficulty in placing himself in them. One that will carry six persons and their provisions may be carried on the shoulder with little trouble.

— Douglas, Journal 1827.

The sturgeon-nosed canoe was designed with a reversed prow to be most suitable for travel through bulrushes, and maneuverable in turbulent waters.

Author Eileen Delehanty Pearkes records in her book about the Sinixt, The Geography of Memory, that ethnographer William Elmendorf recorded the process of making a sturgeon-nosed canoe based on a description by Sinixt Nation elder Nancy Wynecoop: "The mature tree must be felled in spring, when the sap is running. The outer bark is scraped off, then the inner bark is split and peeled off the heartwood in one sheet. The outside shape of the canoe is marked on the ground with stakes. Poles used for the gunwales are fastened to these stakes. Next, willow ribs are fastened to the gunwales, using willow bark twine. The bark is then sewn onto the ribs, using cedar root. An additional layer of bark is fastened less securely on to the outer side of the craft. All seams are glued with warm pine pitch. On the bow and stern of the canoe, the bark is folded over rings of willow. Extra layers are added for strength, shaped into a point, and sewn. A frame of woven poles is placed in the bottom of the canoe and covered with loose grass to sit on."

Elmendorf also refers to a ceremony, including dancing, fasting and sweatbathing, held by Sinixt men prior to the building of a new canoe. The purpose of the ceremony was to make the group "more agreeable with each other and focus their energy".

The sturgeon-nose design is unique to North American canoes, but craft of similar design were discovered in the Amur River region of Siberia in the mid-19th century.

== See also ==
- Sinixt
- Ktunaxa
- Kalispel
