= Tobacco Plains Indian Band =

Yaq̓it ʔa·knuqⱡi’it
- Band No. 603
- Former logo
- People: Ktunaxa
- Headquarters: Grasmere
- Province: British Columbia

Land
- Other reserve: Tobacco Plains 2
- Land area: 42.775 km^{2} (16.516 sq mi)

Population (2019)
- On reserve: 78
- Off reserve: 133
- Total population: 211

Tribal Council
- Ktunaxa Nation

Website
- tobaccoplains.org

Location of Tobacco Plains Band office

The Yaq̓it ʔa·knuqⱡi’it First Nation, formerly called the Tobacco Plains Indian Band or ʔakink̓umⱡasnuqⱡiʔit, are a First Nation based in the East Kootenay region of British Columbia. In the British Columbia Treaty Process, they are part of the Ktunaxa Nation.

== Chief and Councillors ==
- Chief - Heidi Gravelle
- Councillor - Garrett Gravelle
- Councillor - Avery Gravelle
- Councillor - Corey Letcher
- Councillor - Kyle Shottanana

== Treaty process ==
They are in Stage 4 of the BC Treaty Process.

== History ==
In September 2024, they became a signatory of the Buffalo Treaty.
