= Jennifer Porter =

American politician

Tribal chair of the Kootenai Tribe of Idaho
- Incumbent
- Assumed office 2005
- Preceded by: Gary Aitken, Sr.

Personal details
- Born: c. 1974 (age 51–52) Navajo Nation, Fort Defiance
- Citizenship: United States
- Children: 3

Jennifer Porter is the current tribal chair of the Kootenai Tribe of Idaho. She was born on the Navajo Nation in Fort Defiance and is half Navajo and half Kootenai. She replaced her uncle on the Kootenai Tribal Council when she was 23. Porter has promoted educational and cultural programs, including a computer program to teach students words from the Kutenai language. She has three children, two of whom attend the Boundary County School District public school.

Porter has been active in efforts to save the Kootenai River white sturgeon.

In 2009, she signed an agreement with U.S. Customs and Border Protection "to develop an enhanced tribal card for the purpose of crossing the border with the U.S. and Canada". In January 2012, the Kootenai Enhanced Tribal Card (ETC) was designated "as a travel document acceptable for entering into the United States through a land or sea port of entry".
