= ʔaq̓am First Nation =

Location of the ʔaq̓am First Nation

The ʔaq̓am First Nation (Kutenai: [ʔaqʼam]) /ˈɑːkɑːm/ AK-am), also called St. Mary's Indian Band, are a First Nation based in the East Kootenay region of British Columbia. In the British Columbia Treaty Process, they are part of the Ktunaxa Nation.

== Chief and councillors ==
Chief:

- Cheryl Casimer

Councillors:

- Julie Birdstone
- Dallas Cardinal-Clement
- Sancira Steelgun
- Jason Andrew

== Treaty process ==
There are in Stage 4 of the British Columbia Treaty Process.

== Climate ==
Climate is from Cranbrook, 8 km (5.0 mi) away.

Climate data for Cranbrook (Cranbrook/Canadian Rockies International Airport) WMO ID: 71880; coordinates 49°36′44″N 115°46′55″W; elevation: 940.0 m (3,084.0 ft); 1991-2020 normals (sun 1981–2010), , extremes 1901–2010 (Note: Climate data was recorded at Cranbrook from January 1901 to March 1939 and at Cranbrook Airport from February 1938 to present.)
Month	Jan	Feb	Mar	Apr	May	Jun	Jul	Aug	Sep	Oct	Nov	Dec	Year
Record high humidex	0.0	0.0	0.0	0.0	0.2	1.5	9.1	8.3	0.86	0.0	0.0	0.0	19.9
Record high °C (°F)	13.9 (57.0)	13.5 (56.3)	22.4 (72.3)	28.0 (82.4)	34.2 (93.6)	40.1 (104.2)	36.7 (98.1)	40.5 (104.9)	34.9 (94.8)	29.2 (84.6)	19.5 (67.1)	12.2 (54.0)	40.4 (104.7)
Mean daily maximum °C (°F)	−1.9 (28.6)	1.6 (34.9)	7.3 (45.1)	12.8 (55.0)	18.3 (64.9)	21.5 (70.7)	26.9 (80.4)	26.6 (79.9)	20.4 (68.7)	11.4 (52.5)	2.7 (36.9)	−2.8 (27.0)	12.1 (53.8)
Daily mean °C (°F)	−6.1 (21.0)	−3.5 (25.7)	1.8 (35.2)	6.4 (43.5)	11.5 (52.7)	14.9 (58.8)	19.2 (66.6)	18.6 (65.5)	13.1 (55.6)	5.6 (42.1)	−1.3 (29.7)	−6.5 (20.3)	6.1 (43.0)
Mean daily minimum °C (°F)	−10.1 (13.8)	−8.6 (16.5)	−3.8 (25.2)	0.0 (32.0)	4.7 (40.5)	8.2 (46.8)	11.3 (52.3)	10.4 (50.7)	5.7 (42.3)	−0.3 (31.5)	−5.3 (22.5)	−10.1 (13.8)	0.2 (32.4)
Record low °C (°F)	−41.1 (−42.0)	−31.8 (−25.2)	−28.3 (−18.9)	−15.6 (3.9)	−6.1 (21.0)	−1.3 (29.7)	1.0 (33.8)	−1.3 (29.7)	−6.9 (19.6)	−18.5 (−1.3)	−31.8 (−25.2)	−40.0 (−40.0)	−40.0 (−40.0)
Record low wind chill	−43.2	−39.1	−37.2	−19.7	−8.9	−5.0	0.0	−2.9	−9.4	−22.6	−37.4	−46.8	−46.8
Average precipitation mm (inches)	26.7 (1.05)	19.9 (0.78)	26.5 (1.04)	23.2 (0.91)	42.0 (1.65)	62.2 (2.45)	35.4 (1.39)	24.0 (0.94)	30.1 (1.19)	26.1 (1.03)	34.8 (1.37)	34.8 (1.37)	385.5 (15.18)
Average rainfall mm (inches)	4.8 (0.19)	3.4 (0.13)	11.9 (0.47)	17.7 (0.70)	41.1 (1.62)	66.4 (2.61)	38.1 (1.50)	25.4 (1.00)	30.9 (1.22)	18.7 (0.74)	13.8 (0.54)	6.6 (0.26)	278.9 (10.98)
Average snowfall cm (inches)	27.8 (10.9)	17.4 (6.9)	15.5 (6.1)	6.4 (2.5)	1.4 (0.6)	0.0 (0.0)	0.0 (0.0)	0.0 (0.0)	0.0 (0.0)	5.8 (2.3)	23.9 (9.4)	34.6 (13.6)	132.6 (52.2)
Average precipitation days (≥ 0.2 mm)	12.3	9.1	10.0	9.2	11.0	13.4	8.6	7.2	8.0	9.6	12.3	12.9	123.5
Average rainy days (≥ 0.2 mm)	3.0	2.3	5.3	7.4	10.9	13.7	8.8	7.7	8.0	8.0	5.4	2.5	82.9
Average snowy days (≥ 0.2 cm)	10.9	7.6	6.4	3.0	0.7	0.0	0.0	0.0	0.0	1.8	7.8	12.1	50.2
Average relative humidity (%) (at 1500 LST)	71.9	58.5	48.7	41.0	40.2	42.6	33.7	32.2	39.7	50.7	67.8	75.2	50.2
Mean monthly sunshine hours	63.5	106.9	163.2	215.0	256.7	267.8	315.1	302.7	218.2	159.5	69.8	51.9	2,190.5
Percentage possible sunshine	23.7	37.5	44.4	52.2	54.0	55.0	64.2	67.7	57.5	47.6	25.5	20.4	45.8
Source: Environment and Climate Change Canada (sun 1981-2010) (January minimum) {June maximum) (August maximum)

== Demographics ==
The ʔaq̓am First Nation had 384 members as of August 2025. (345 as of 2009).

== See also ==
- Kootenay Indian Residential School
