= Hilliers, British Columbia =

Hilliers
- Village
- Location of Hilliers in British Columbia Hilliers (British Columbia)
- Coordinates: 49°31′N 124°48′W
- Country: Canada
- Province: British Columbia
- Regional district: Nanaimo

Area
  - Total: 29.05 km^{2} (11.22 sq mi)

Population (2021)
  - Total: 1,590
  - Density: 54.7/km^{2} (142/sq mi)
- Time zone: UTC−07:00 (PT)

Hilliers is a village located on Vancouver Island, in the province of British Columbia, Canada. As of the 2021 Census, it had a population of 1,590. It's neighbouring communities are Errington, Coombs, and Qualicum Beach.

== History ==
In 1913, the first annual Fall Fair was held in Hilliers. In 1923 the Fall fair was moved to neighbouring Coombs, and has been held there ever since.

In 1947, a group of 200 Doukhobors set up a communal farm in Hilliers. They purchased a 348 acre plot, tilled the land and grew crops, built a school, and a canning plant. They lived on the farm for six years before leaving the area.

== Geography ==
Hamilton Marsh, part of the French Creek Watershed, is located in Hilliers. It is accessible to the public and cared for by The Hamilton Wetlands and Forest Preservation Society.
