= Defeat Duchenne Canada =

Canadian health charity

Defeat Duchenne Canada, formerly Jesse's Journey (French: le Reve de Jesse) is a Canadian charity focused on funding research into Duchenne muscular dystrophy. Founded in 1994 and named for Jesse Davidson, Jesse's Journey is based out of London, Ontario, with a satellite office in Montreal, Quebec. Jesse's Journey is the only Canadian charity that solely exists to fund research into Duchenne.

== History ==
Jesse Davidson was six years old when he was diagnosed with Duchenne muscular dystrophy. In 1994, The Davidsons created The Foundation for Gene and Cell Therapy (known as Jesse's Journey). On May 20, 1995, Jesse's Journey began its first steps at the Manitoba/Ontario border. Jesse's father, John Davidson, walked 3,300 kilometres to Ottawa, pushing Jesse in his wheelchair. This first journey raised $1.5M for research. Davidson is the holder of the Guinness World Record for the fastest crossing of Canada on foot.

On April 10, 1998 – Jesse's 18th birthday – Jesse's Journey: A Father's Tribute began. John Davidson's goal was to cross Canada on foot, raising funds and awareness across the country. Davidson succeeded in walking the 8,300 kilometres across Canada and raised $2M for research. This allowed The Foundation for Gene and Cell Therapy to create the Jesse Davidson Endowment – a fund that in 2015 stands at $11M and is a vehicle through which Jesse’s Journey can fund research in perpetuity, until a cure is found.

In 1998 Davidson and his mother Sherene along with Journey volunteer Mario Chioini flew to Paris, France to assist the French Association le Dystrophe Musculaire with their 30-hour telethon.

On November 6, 2009, at the age of 29, Davidson lost his battle with Duchenne muscular dystrophy.

On Christmas Eve 2009, one month after his son Jesse died, Davidson carried the Olympic Torch as London's final torch-bearer in the 2010 Olympic Torch Relay, in honour of his son who had been named London's official torch-bearer earlier in the year.

The organization was renamed in 2022 to "Defeat Duchenne Canada", maintaining the same goals and objectives.

== Research ==
Jesse's Journey is the only Canadian charity that solely exists to fund research into treatments and a cure for Duchenne muscular dystrophy. Through a rigorous annual granting process, Jesse's Journey seeks to fund the most promising research from around the world. Proposals are peer-reviewed by external reviewers.

In 2015, the 20th anniversary of John and Jesse's journey across Ontario, Jesse's Journey reached a milestone by for the first time granting more than $1M in a single year.
