= Martha Benjamin =

Canadian indigenous cross country skier

Martha Benjamin (born 1935) from Old Crow, Yukon (Vuntut Gwitch'in First Nation) is a Canadian Indigenous cross country skier. With the guidance of Jean-Marie Mouchet (Oblate Priest), she took up the sport of cross-country skiing. Throughout the late 1950s and early 1960s, Benjamin was a national level skier competing throughout Canada, the United States and Europe.

== Personal life ==
A lifelong resident of Old Crow, Yukon, Benjamin married before the age of 25 and had five children and thirteen grandchildren.

== Major sport achievements and rewards ==
- US Nationals in New Hampshire - twenty-sixth place finish in a group of sixty-nine men
- 1963 - The 10 km (43.29 minutes) women's Canadian women's Nordic Champion Cross Country Skiing in Midland, Ontario
- Trained with Team Canada, however family obligations, as well as funding and support from the Canadian Olympic Committee stopped her for competing at the 1964 Winter Olympics (Innsbruck, Austria).
- 1983 - Inducted into the Yukon Sports Hall of Fame.
