= Shoreacres, British Columbia =

Shoreacres
- Location of Shoreacres in British Columbia
- Coordinates: 49°24′59″N 117°32′04″W
- Country: Canada
- Province: British Columbia
- Region: West Kootenay
- Regional District: Central Kootenay

Area
  - Total: 1.72 km^{2} (0.66 sq mi)

Population (2021)
  - Total: 317
  - Density: 184/km^{2} (477/sq mi)
- Area codes: 250, 778, 236, & 672
- Highways: Highway 3A

Shoreacres is an unincorporated community in the West Kootenay region of southeastern British Columbia. This former ferry landing lies on the northwest shore of the Kootenay River and northeast shore of the Slocan River. The location, on BC Highway 3A, is by road about 20 kilometres (12 mi) northeast of Castlegar, and 24 kilometres (15 mi) southwest of Nelson.

== Ferry and road bridges ==
From 1888, F. Fitzgerald operated a 9.1-by-3.7-metre (30 by 12 ft) scow across the mouth of the Slocan. Fitzgerald also ran a small store. Oliver Redpath succeeded him as the ferry operator. On one occasion, a man drowned while attempting to cross on a log.

In 1890, H. Abbott was awarded the charter. That June, after recent repairs, the cable snapped. On rushing downstream, the scow struck a snag, which provided an opportunity for the three passengers to safely reach land. John (Jack) Evans, the operator, unsuccessfully tried to secure the ferry but eventually jumped overboard and swam ashore with great difficulty. Weeks later, Evans resigned to seek a less hazardous job, and the Canadian Pacific Railway (CP), which was then awarded the franchise, installed a new boat. After operating into the fall, the service ceased for the winter, when the scows were rebuilt. The new railway bridge being complete, the ferry did not recommence in the spring. Assumedly, over the next two decades, people used either private boats or the CP bridge to cross the river.

The 1910 public road bridge comprised a 47-metre (153 ft) deck span, an adjoining 20-metre (64 ft) inverted truss, and trestle-bent approaches. The 1926 bridge comprised 43-metre (140 ft) and 24-metre (80 ft) Howe truss spans on concrete piers, with a 75-metre (247 ft) approach. For the 1962 concrete span, the construction substructure was awarded to Kenyon & Co ($85,500) and the superstructure to the Western Bridge Division of Canadian Iron Foundries ($206,484). In 2018, the bridge underwent a $1.1-million deck resurfacing.

== Name origin ==
The former ferry inspired the original name of Slocan Crossing. By 1892, the Columbia and Kootenay Railway (C&K), a CP subsidiary, adopted the same for the train station. The next year, the name appears on Perry's Mining Map. In the late 1890s, newspaper reports loosely refer to Slocan Junction as Slocan Crossing. Thomas J. Lancaster, who owned the land in the vicinity, had a private siding called Lancaster Spur. Not surprisingly, the settlement became known as Lancaster Spur. The usage of Shoreacres dates at least from 1908. The name describes a distinctive geographical feature, where the river shore surrounds to the south, east, and west. In 1909, CP and the new post office adopted the change, but the new school waited until 1914. When the Doukhobors began buying local land in 1912, they named the community Prekrasnoye (beautiful in Russian) but with the collapse of this movement, this alternative eventually disappeared even among the descendants.

== Railway ==
The northeastward advance of the rail head from Sproat's Landing was almost at the Slocan in September 1890, where progress was halted until the railway bridge was completed a month later. In May 1891, the last spike was driven at Nelson and passenger train service commenced the next month.

The Slocan railway bridge required extensive repairs after being damaged by the 1894 flood. In 1902, a steel bridge was erected, which in turn needed repair when the supports washed out the next year.

In 1908, CP took over the private Lancaster spur.

In 1940, an occupant died, when a vehicle crashed into an eastbound locomotive pulling a caboose at a private crossing near the bridge.

Train Timetables (Regular stop or Flag stop)
	Mile	1894	1905	1909	1912	1916	1919	1929	1932	1935	1939	1943	1948	1954	1960	1963
Slocan Jctn	11.9		Reg	Reg												
South Slocan	11.9				Reg	Reg	Reg	Reg	Reg	Reg	Reg	Reg	Reg	Reg	Flag	Flag
Slocan Crossing	14.3	Flag	^{a}													
Shoreacres	14.3			Flag	Flag	Flag	Flag	Flag	Flag	Flag	Flag	Flag	Flag	Flag	Flag	Flag
Glade	15.6				Flag	Flag	Flag	Flag	Flag	Flag	Flag	Flag	Flag	Flag	Flag	Flag
Tarrys	17.9			Flag	Flag	Flag	Flag	Flag	Flag	Flag	Flag	Flag	Flag	Flag		

^a. In 1905, Lancaster Spur became a flag station.

Census population: Shoreacres
Year	Pop.	±%
1951	200	—
1956	133	−33.5%
1961	80	−39.8%
1966	285	+256.2%
1971	345	+21.1%
1976	426	+23.5%
1981		—
1986	349	—
1991	277	−20.6%
1996		—
2001		—
2006	290	—
2011	320	+10.3%
2016	324	+1.2%
2021	317	−2.2%
Source: Statistics Canada

== Community ==
Gallagher's Slocan House hotel operated for a few months in 1892. Prior to the opening of the C&K branch to Slocan City in 1897, the Murray and Matheson pack train was based at the crossing.

A general store existed at least from the 1920s to the 1950s. The post office closed in 1973 and the school in 1985.

In 2012, the Kieran Galbraith Shoreacres Beach Memorial Park was established on the banks of the Slocan. That year, large numbers attended the centennial celebration at what had been a predominantly Doukhobor community. Established in 1912, the Doukhobor cemetery remains in use.

In 2020, the first net zero emissions residence in the Kootenays was built at Shoreacres.

The nearest BC Transit stop is Playmor Junction.

== Freedomites ==
Various incidents linked to the Freedomites:
1940: Fire razed general store.
1946: Fires destroyed Doukhobor community hall and a residence.
1947: Fires consumed dozens of residences.
1949: Attempted arson of CP station.
1950: CP track dynamited.
1953: Fires destroyed two buildings.
1961: Power poles dynamited.
1962: Power pole dynamited and nine residences razed.
