= Ɂakisq̓nuk First Nation =

ʔakisq̓nuk First Nation
- Band No. 604
- People: Ktunaxa
- Headquarters: Windermere
- Province: British Columbia

Land
- Main reserve: Columbia Lake 3
- Reserve: St. Mary's 1A
- Land area: 40.647 km^{2} (15.694 sq mi)

Population (2019)
- On reserve: 100
- Off reserve: 279
- Total population: 379

Government
- Chief: Donald Sam

Tribal Council
- Ktunaxa Nation

Website
- akisqnuk.org

Location of ʔakisq̓nuk First Nation

The ʔakisq̓nuk First Nation (/əˈkɪsk(ə)nʊk/), also spelled Akisqnuk First Nation, and formerly known as the Columbia Lake First Nation are a Ktunaxa First Nation in the Kootenays district of the Canadian province of British Columbia. In the British Columbia Treaty Process they are part of the Ktunaxa Nation Council.

== Treaty process ==
As of 2022, ʔakisq̓nuk First Nation was in Stage 5 of the BC Treaty Process.
