= Kootenay Indian Residential School =

Defunct Canadian residential school

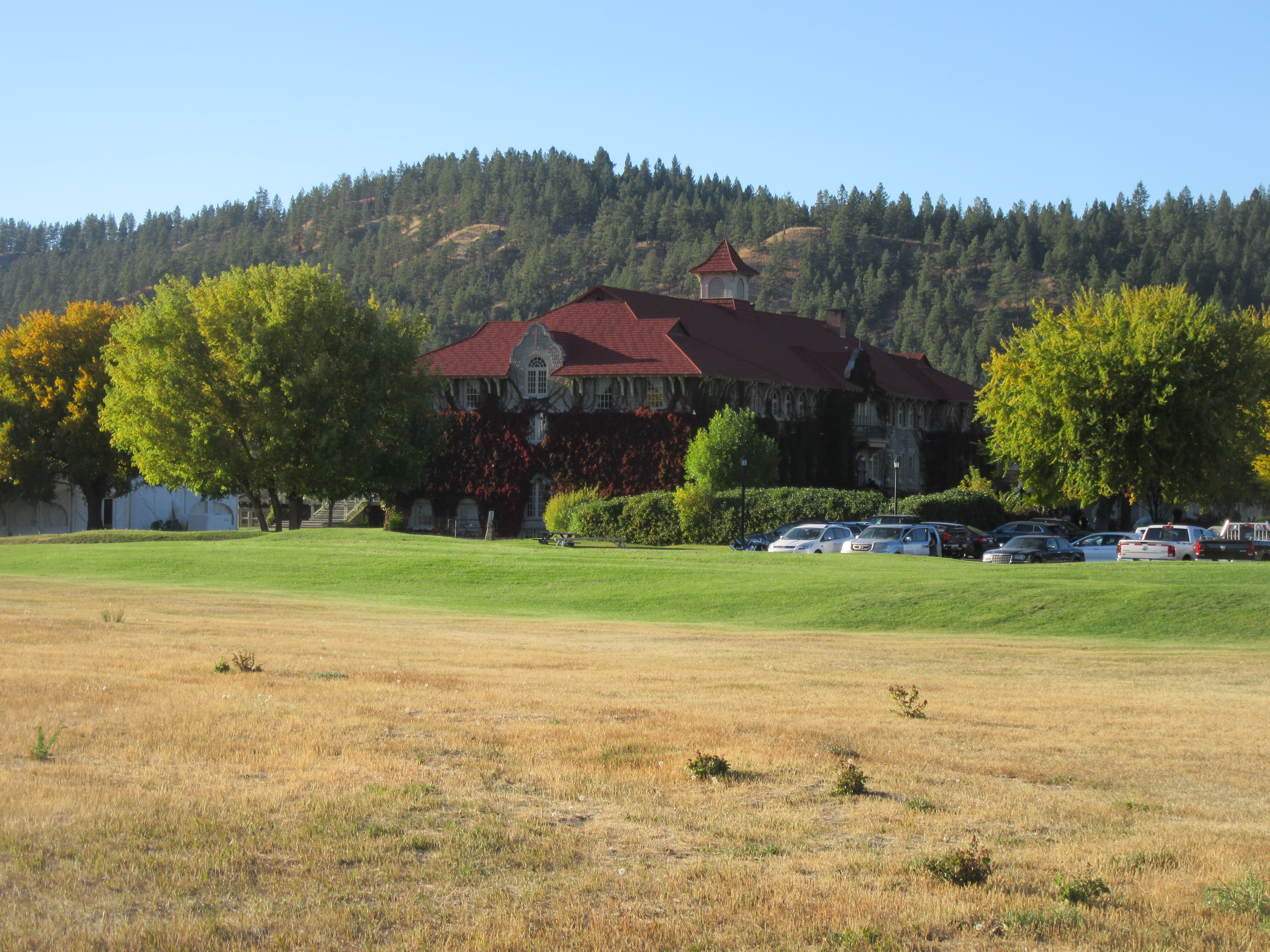
- St. Eugene's Mission (now a golf resort) in 2017

Location
- Cranbrook, British Columbia; Canada; 49.5860°N 115.7572°W

Information
- Former name: St. Eugene's Mission School
- Type: Canadian Indian residential school
- Religious affiliation: Catholic
- Established: 1890
- Closed: 1970
- Authority: Catholic Church in Canada
- Gender: Coed
- Language: English

The Kootenay Indian Residential School, composed of the St. Eugene's and St. Mary's mission schools, was a part of the Canadian Indian residential school system and operated in Cranbrook, British Columbia between 1890 and 1970. The school, run by the Missionary Oblates of Mary Immaculate of the Roman Catholic Church, first opened in 1890. It was replaced by an industrial school in 1912 that continued to operate until it was closed in 1970. Between 1912 and 1970, over 5,000 children from across British Columbia and Alberta attended the school. (Note: The Indian Residential School History & Dialogue Centre includes a list of students' home communities.) The building has been home to the St. Eugene Golf Resort and Casino since 2000.

== History ==
The presence of Roman Catholic missionaries in British Columbia was limited until 1858, when they expanded operations into what is now Canada. Their first mission opened at Okanagan Lake in 1860 and a mission in the Kootenays opened in 1874.

The first school opened in 1890, just north of Cranbrook. Operated by the Oblates of Mary Immaculate it was replaced in 1912 with room for 126 students. In his 1891 submission to the Indian Affairs Annual Report school principal Nicolas Coccola commented on parental resistance to the school. He wrote: "The parents, who at the opening of the school were on the eve of breaking out into war with the whites, objected to send their children at first, but seem now highly pleased, and come and offer their children, more than we are allowed by the Government at present to take." The Truth and Reconciliation Commission of Canada argued that the parent's positive feelings were temporary, pointing to comments from Coccola in 1922 in which he complained about collecting children from their home communities with no assistance from parents "unless coaxed and threatened."

Reverend James Mulvihill succeeded Reverend G.P. Dunlop as head of the school in 1958, following Dunlop's departure to take over as head of the Kamloops Indian Residential School.

The Canadian government took over operation of the school in 1969 and closed the facility in 1970.

Through an Indigenous-led restoration project, the school building was converted to St. Eugene's Golf Resort and Casino. The golf course opened in 2000, followed by a casino in 2002 and a hotel in 2003.

== Unmarked graves ==
On June 30, 2021, the ʔaq̓am First Nation announced that 182 unmarked graves had been discovered using the assistance of ground-penetrating radar. The Leadership of the First Nation has indicated that this was the site of a cemetery and that deterioration of the original wooden crosses over time left graves unmarked; The Leadership states: "These factors, among others, make it extremely difficult to establish whether or not these unmarked graves contain the remains of children who attended the St. Eugene Residential School."
