= Lumberton, British Columbia =

Lumberton
- Location of Lumberton in British Columbia
- Coordinates: 49°25′00″N 115°52′00″W
- Country: Canada
- Province: British Columbia

Lumberton is a ghost town in the East Kootenay part of British Columbia. The town is situated south of Cranbrook. Lumberton was once known as Watts or Wattsburg after A.E. Watts. Watts was in charge of the town after the turn of the century. Watts was the owner and founder of a lumber mill. Later, he sold his mill to B.C. Spruce Mills Ltd., who rebuilt the mill and updated it. Around that time Lumberton was born with a population of 225. Lumberton contained a post office and general store. Three dozen company houses were on the townsite. When the area became barren of timber, the town of Lumberton became deserted. In 1973 the cement walls of the mill could be seen as well as abandoned homes.
