= Amelia Island Wildlife Management Area =

Wildlife Management Area in Montana

- Amelia Island WMA
- IUCN category VI (protected area with sustainable use of natural resources)
- Location within Montana Location within the United States
- Location: Treasure County, Montana
- Nearest city: Hysham
- Coordinates: 46°18′50″N 107°13′36″W
- Area: 238 acres (96 ha)
- Governing body: Montana Department of Fish, Wildlife and Parks

Amelia Island Wildlife Management Area, also referred to as Amelia Island, is a 238 acres (96 ha) tract of protected land located in Treasure County, Montana, owned and managed by the Montana Department of Fish, Wildlife and Parks (MFWP). The Wildlife Management area, located in the Yellowstone River, is used primarily in tandem with the nearby Amelia Island Fishing Access.

== Flora and fauna ==
There is great variety in the species that can be found on the Island. Birds are found in abundance, with four different species observed, the great blue heron, red-tailed hawk, hairy woodpecker, and western wood pewee. In addition to avian species, white-tailed deer, meadow voles, eastern fox squirrels, and woodhouse's toads have also been observed in the management area.
