= Scotchtown, Nova Scotia =

Community in Nova Scotia, Canada

Coordinates: 46°14′23.4″N 60°05′41.7″W

Scotchtown in Nova Scotia

Scotchtown (Scottish Gaelic: Baile nan Gàidheal) is a community in the Canadian province of Nova Scotia, located in Cape Breton Regional Municipality.

The community is located immediately south of New Waterford.
