= Shuswap Indian Band =

First Nations government in British Columbia, Canada

- Band No. 605
- Kenpesqʼt
- People: Secwepemc
- Headquarters: Invermere
- Province: British Columbia

Land
- Main reserve: Shuswap Indian Reserve
- Reserve: St. Mary's Indian Reserve No. 1A (shared)
- Land area: 18.665

Population (August 2026)
- On reserve: 77
- On other land: 29
- Off reserve: 235
- Total population: 341

Government
- Chief: Barbara Cote
- Council: Mark Thomas, Richard Martin

Tribal Council
- Shuswap Nation Tribal Council

Website
- shuswapband.net

The Shuswap Indian Band (Shuswap language: Kenpesqʼt), also known as the Shuswap Band, is a First Nations band government of the Secwepemc (Shuswap) people in the East Kootenay region of British Columbia, Canada, and a member of the Shuswap Nation Tribal Council. Its main reserve, the Shuswap Indian Reserve, lies just north of Invermere on the upper Columbia River, separated from the other Secwepemc bands by the Selkirk Mountains. The reserve had a population of 319 at the 2021 census. The band descends from the Kinbasket family, a group of Secwepemc who moved east into Ktunaxa territory in the early nineteenth century, and it was a member of the Ktunaxa/Kinbasket Tribal Council until 2005.

The band is governed by an elected chief and two councillors. Barbara Cote has been chief since 2014, when disclosures that the previous chief and a councillor had each been paid about $200,000 a year led voters to replace the council. The band adopted its own land code in 2015, and its development corporation has built the reserve into a commercial hub for the Invermere area, including the regional airport. The band is one of the lead First Nations in the Columbia River Treaty renegotiation and in the initiative to return salmon to the upper Columbia.

== History ==
The band originates with the Kinbasket (Kenpesqʼt) family, a group of Secwepemc who split from the main body of the nation in the early 1800s and travelled east from Shuswap territory into Ktunaxa territory in search of a permanent home. They had settled in the upper Columbia River area by about 1846. Ktunaxa leadership permitted the newcomers to stay, and the two peoples have intermarried for generations.

During his 1866 exploration of the Columbia, the surveyor Walter Moberly employed the band's headman, whom he recorded as Kinbaskit and described as reliable, and named Kinbasket Lake in his honour. The name appeared as "Kinbasket Lake" on Mohun's 1884 map of British Columbia, and it is now borne by the reservoir formed by Mica Dam. According to a 1927 account collected from the chief's grandson, a Kinbasket chief also guided the surveyor A. B. Rogers through the mountains in 1882, and the band's reserve was granted in 1883. The main reserve covers 1,074 hectares (2,663 acres), with a second reserve, St. Mary's Indian Reserve No. 1A, of 792.5 hectares shared with Ktunaxa bands. In nineteenth-century records the community was variously enumerated under the names Clocktoot (c. 1881), Kuittas (c. 1881), and Kinbasket (c. 1887). The ethnographer James Teit recorded the Kinbasket as a distinct division of the Secwepemc in his 1909 monograph The Shuswap.

Band children were sent to the St. Eugene's Mission School near Cranbrook, which operated as a residential school from 1912 to 1970. After the school closed, the building and surrounding land were turned over to the four Ktunaxa bands and the Shuswap Band, which redeveloped it as the St. Eugene golf resort and casino, opened in stages from 2000 to 2003. The five bands regained sole ownership in June 2017. Salmon, which the band had fished at the beds near Athalmer, disappeared from the upper Columbia after Grand Coulee Dam was completed in 1942. Under the Columbia River Treaty, Mica Dam was completed in 1973 and its reservoir flooded the Columbia valley north of Golden, downstream of the reserve. The reservoir was named McNaughton Lake until February 1980, when the province restored the name Kinbasket Lake in response to local pressure. The band states that the loss of salmon, residential schooling, and the Indian Act together stripped the community of much of its language and culture.

== Governance ==
The band is governed by an elected chief and two councillors. It historically held elections every two years under the Indian Act. It later opted into the First Nations Elections Act, under which its first election was set for 1 November 2018 and terms run four years. It is developing a custom election code. In the October 2022 election – the band's first in four years – Barbara Cote continued as chief, Mark Thomas retained his council seat, and Richard Martin was newly elected, with terms running to 2026.

Cote became chief following the November 2014 election, in which band spending was the central issue. In the week before the vote, band members publicized financial disclosures filed under the First Nations Financial Transparency Act showing that Paul Sam, chief for more than 30 years, and councillor Alice Sam, his former wife, had each been paid about $202,000 in the 2013–14 fiscal year. Voters replaced both with a new council of Cote and two new councillors, who then selected Cote as chief. Sam and family members had received more than $4.1 million over the four years ending in 2014. His son, as chief executive of the band's development corporation, had drawn a salary averaging $536,000 between 2010 and 2013. The figures attracted national attention. The new council made debt repayment an early priority.

The band is one of seventeen band governments of the Secwepemc nation and a member of the Shuswap Nation Tribal Council, based in Kamloops. It is not a party to the British Columbia Treaty Process. The Ktunaxa bands continued at the former joint treaty table after the band withdrew.

== Demographics ==
At the 2021 Canadian census, the Shuswap Indian Reserve census subdivision had a population of 319 living in 183 private dwellings. Statistics Canada recorded 150 households on the reserve, with a home-ownership rate of 60 per cent. The census count includes non-member residents, who make up the large majority of the reserve's population. As of August 2026, the band had 341 registered members, of whom 77 lived on its own reserves, 29 on other reserves, and 235 off reserve.

== Land and resources ==
The band's land code under the First Nations Land Management Act took effect on 1 February 2015, giving it direct authority over its reserve lands. Beginning in 2006 it signed a series of forestry agreements with the Province of British Columbia, most recently a forest consultation and revenue-sharing agreement in 2021. In 2019 it joined six other Secwepemc governments in the Qwelminte Secwepemc government-to-government letter of commitment on reconciliation.

Band councillor Mark Thomas leads the Secwepemc technical team in the renegotiation of the Columbia River Treaty and sits on the treaty's negotiating advisory team, which brings the Syilx Okanagan, Secwepemc, and Ktunaxa nations together with Canada and British Columbia. In 2023 the Secwepemc bands of the upper Columbia signed an interim revenue-sharing agreement relating to the treaty with British Columbia. The band is one of the lead First Nations in the Bringing the Salmon Home initiative, also known as the Columbia River Salmon Reintroduction Initiative, launched in 2019 by the Syilx Okanagan, Secwepemc, and Ktunaxa nations in partnership with the governments of Canada and British Columbia to return salmon to the upper Columbia. Thomas chairs the initiative's executive working group, and the band has hosted ceremonial salmon-fry releases in its communities.

== Economy ==
The band's economic development is led by the Kinbasket Development Corporation, a wholly owned corporate arm. Commercial development on the band's lands near Invermere includes a Home Hardware building centre, a Tim Hortons, a Super 8 hotel, a Kicking Horse Coffee manufacturing and warehouse facility, and the Columbia Valley Regional Airport. The band also created the Kinbasket Water and Sewer Company and has leased designated lands for residential and commercial projects. A federal review estimated that the developments supported roughly 284 regional jobs, 57 of them held by residents of the reserve. In 2012 the band, through the development corporation, supported the proposed Jumbo Glacier Resort, in contrast to the opposition of the Ktunaxa Nation.

In 2019 the band began working with the neighbouring District of Invermere on joint community economic development, initially through the federally supported Community Economic Development Initiative. The partnership was formally named the Shuswap Kenpesqʼt Invermere Partnership (SKIP) in October 2022.
