= Kootenai Tribe of Idaho =

ʔaq̓anqmi
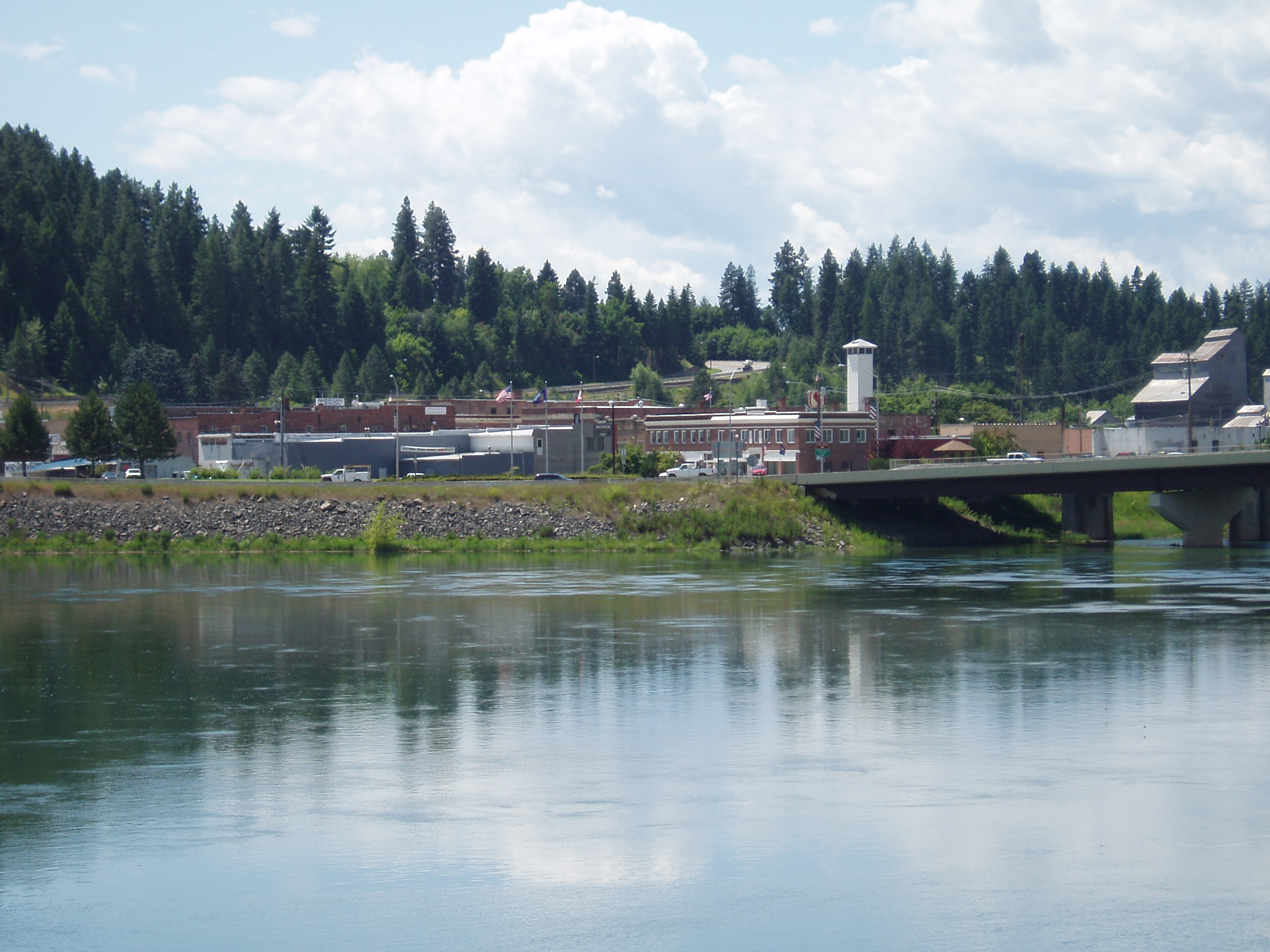
- Bonners Ferry on the Kootenai River

Total population
- 150

Regions with significant populations
- United States (Idaho)

Languages
- English, Kutenai, English

Religion
- Indigenous tribal religion, Sun Dance religion

Related ethnic groups
- other Kootenai people, Interior Salish people, Kalispel people

The Kootenai Tribe of Idaho (Kutenai language: ʔaq̓anqmi) is a federally recognized tribe of Lower Kootenai people. They are an Indigenous people of the Northwest Plateau based in northern Idaho.

They are one of five federally recognized tribes in Idaho. The others are Coeur d'Alene, Nez Perce, Shoshone-Bannock, and Duck Valley Indian Reservation (Western Shoshone-Northern Paiute). They have 150 enrolled citizens.

== Name ==
Their name for themselves is ʔaq̓anqmi. They are also called the Idaho Ksanka. The Ktunaxa (English: /tʌˈnɑːhɑː/ tun-AH-hah; Ktunaxa: [ktunʌ́χɑ̝]) are also known as Kutenai (English: /ˈkuːtəneɪ, -tneɪ, -ni/), Kootenay (predominant spelling in Canada), and Kootenai (predominant spelling in the United States).

== Reservation ==
Map of the Kootenai tribal territory and neighboring tribes in Idaho.

The Kootenai Reservation was first established in 1896. After subsequent land loss, the reservation was re-established in 1974. The reservation is 2,695 acres (4.2 sq mi; 10.9 km^{2}) in Boundary County, along U.S. Route 95. Their reservation is 2,200 acres large.

== Government ==
The tribe's headquarters is in Bonners Ferry, Idaho. The tribe is governed by a democratically elected, nine-member tribal council. The current administration is as follows:

- Chairman: Gary FX Aitken Jr.
- Jennifer Porter
- Amethyst Aitken
- Ronald Abraham
- Diane David
- Duane E. Saunders
- Louie Abraham
- Velma Bahe
- Kim Cooper.

== Language ==
Historically, Kootenai people have spoken the Kutenai language, a language isolate. It has a dictionary and grammar and is written in the Latin script.

== History ==
The Kootenai people lived along the Kootenai River in Idaho, Montana, and British Columbia. They were hunter-gatherers, and salmon was an important staple to their diets. They have permanent winter villages of cone-shaped houses made from wooden poles and rush mats.

In 1855 the tribe refused to sign a treaty with the US government that would require them to cede their aboriginal lands in Idaho and consolidate with several other smaller tribes in Montana. The Dawes Act broke up tribal land holdings into individual allotments. Due to illegal land loss, the tribe was awarded $425,000 in a land claims settlement in 1960.

On September 20, 1974, the 67 members of the Kootenai Tribe formally declared war on the United States, seeking federal recognition. Initial demands were for a 128,000-acre (200 sq mi; 520 km^{2}) reservation and compensation for 1,600,000 acres (2,500 sq mi; 6,470 km^{2}) of ancestral lands. They did not engage in violence, and, by calling attention to their situation, the tribe was deeded 12.5 acres (5.1 ha) of federal land surrounding the former mission in Bonners Ferry. It was enacted by S. 634, signed by President Gerald Ford in October.

== Economic development ==
Since 1986, the Kootenai Tribe has owned and operated the Kootenai River Inn in Bonners Ferry. It is now the Kootenai River Inn Casino and Spa, also has the Springs Restaurant, Casino Deli, the Kootenai Day Spa, and gift shop.

Construction on the Sturgeon Station travel center began in June 2022, with the project timeline reported in early 2023. The facility, located along US-95, is a combined gas station, convenience store, and Sonic restaurant

Reservation industries include timber, tourism, and selling sand and gravel. The tribe also owns a sturgeon hatchery.

== See also ==
- Confederated Salish and Kootenai Tribes of the Flathead Nation
