= Coombs, British Columbia =

Human settlement in British Columbia, Canada

Coordinates: 49°18′16″N 124°25′10″W

Location of Coombs in the Regional District of Nanaimo, British Columbia

Coombs is a small community on Vancouver Island in the Regional District of Nanaimo, British Columbia, situated on provincial highway 4A approximately 10 km (6.2 mi) west of Parksville. According to the 2021 census, Coombs is home to 1672 people.

Coombs is known for its Old Country Market (also known as Goats on the Roof, which features a family of goats living on the roof), Butterfly World (which includes a small indoor tropical rainforest), the 106 year old Coombs Fall Fair, and the Coombs Bluegrass Festival held at the Coombs Rodeo Grounds every B.C. Day weekend.

== History ==
The area was historically inhabited by the Coast Salish peoples, including the Snuneymuxw First Nation, who have lived in the region for more than 5,000 years.

=== Etymology ===
Coombs was established as a settlement in the late 19th century. The settlement of Coombs began to grow during the early years of European settlement. The area was named after Commissioner Thomas Bales Coombs, head of the Salvation Army movement in Canada in the early 1900s. The Salvation Army honoured Coombs' retirement in 1911 by naming the new colony after him. Commissioner Coombs never visited the area.

=== European Settlers ===
In 1908, Walter Ford built a log house that is still standing today on the Alberni Highway.

The community was established in 1910 under a Salvation Army emigration plan, in which people were relocated from crowded cities in Great Britain to Canada. Walter Ford, of Ford Logging from Duncan, and his brother-in-law John West, were tasked with preparing Errington for the arrival of the newcomers from England. The newcomers were led by Ensign Crego. Crego was trained in farming skills.

In 1911, the General Store was built, which also served as the Post Office. This building functioned as a general store until 2021, and is now a store selling Dutch products.

In 1910, a log cabin that had previously been the residence of Willian Buss was used as the first school house.

In 1912, the French Creek School opened at the request of the Coombs' Salvation Army Colony. The school was the first government built school in the area. The school closed in 2014.

In 1913, the first annual Fall Fair was held in neighbouring Hilliers.

In 1921 the Coombs Community Hall opened.

In 1923 the Fall Fair was moved to Coombs.

== Climate ==
Under the Köppen climate classification, Coombs is located at the northernmost limits of the cool dry-summer subtropical zone (Csb) or cool-summer Mediterranean climate, due to its dry summers.

Climate data for Coombs
Month	Jan	Feb	Mar	Apr	May	Jun	Jul	Aug	Sep	Oct	Nov	Dec	Year
Record high °C (°F)	15.0 (59.0)	18.0 (64.4)	22.5 (72.5)	26.0 (78.8)	30.0 (86.0)	33.5 (92.3)	35.0 (95.0)	33.0 (91.4)	33.0 (91.4)	24.0 (75.2)	17.0 (62.6)	17.0 (62.6)	35.0 (95.0)
Mean daily maximum °C (°F)	6.0 (42.8)	7.6 (45.7)	10.3 (50.5)	13.8 (56.8)	17.6 (63.7)	20.6 (69.1)	24.0 (75.2)	24.2 (75.6)	20.6 (69.1)	13.8 (56.8)	8.2 (46.8)	5.5 (41.9)	14.4 (57.9)
Daily mean °C (°F)	2.8 (37.0)	3.4 (38.1)	5.4 (41.7)	8.2 (46.8)	11.6 (52.9)	14.6 (58.3)	17.2 (63.0)	17.1 (62.8)	13.8 (56.8)	8.9 (48.0)	4.7 (40.5)	2.6 (36.7)	9.2 (48.6)
Mean daily minimum °C (°F)	−0.4 (31.3)	−0.9 (30.4)	0.5 (32.9)	2.5 (36.5)	5.5 (41.9)	8.4 (47.1)	10.4 (50.7)	10.0 (50.0)	7.0 (44.6)	3.9 (39.0)	1.1 (34.0)	−0.4 (31.3)	4.0 (39.2)
Record low °C (°F)	−14.5 (5.9)	−17.5 (0.5)	−9.0 (15.8)	−5.0 (23.0)	−3.0 (26.6)	2.0 (35.6)	3.0 (37.4)	2.0 (35.6)	−2.0 (28.4)	−8.0 (17.6)	−18.0 (−0.4)	−18.0 (−0.4)	−18.0 (−0.4)
Average precipitation mm (inches)	176.3 (6.94)	110.1 (4.33)	109.0 (4.29)	75.1 (2.96)	56.3 (2.22)	46.6 (1.83)	24.4 (0.96)	34.5 (1.36)	39.3 (1.55)	113.9 (4.48)	188.2 (7.41)	164.9 (6.49)	1,138.5 (44.82)
Average rainfall mm (inches)	162.8 (6.41)	100.1 (3.94)	103.1 (4.06)	75.1 (2.96)	56.3 (2.22)	46.6 (1.83)	24.4 (0.96)	34.5 (1.36)	39.3 (1.55)	113.2 (4.46)	180.7 (7.11)	157.3 (6.19)	1,093.2 (43.04)
Average snowfall cm (inches)	13.5 (5.3)	10.1 (4.0)	5.9 (2.3)	0.0 (0.0)	0.0 (0.0)	0.0 (0.0)	0.0 (0.0)	0.0 (0.0)	0.0 (0.0)	0.7 (0.3)	7.5 (3.0)	7.6 (3.0)	45.2 (17.8)
Average precipitation days (≥ 0.2 mm)	19.8	15.8	18.3	15.7	13.6	11.7	6.5	7.0	8.0	17.2	20.5	19.3	173.4
Average rainy days (≥ 0.2 mm)	18.0	14.5	17.8	15.7	13.6	11.7	6.5	7.0	8.0	17.1	19.7	18.0	167.6
Average snowy days (≥ 0.2 cm)	2.8	2.0	1.5	0.0	0.1	0.0	0.0	0.0	0.0	0.2	1.4	2.4	10.3

== Gallery ==
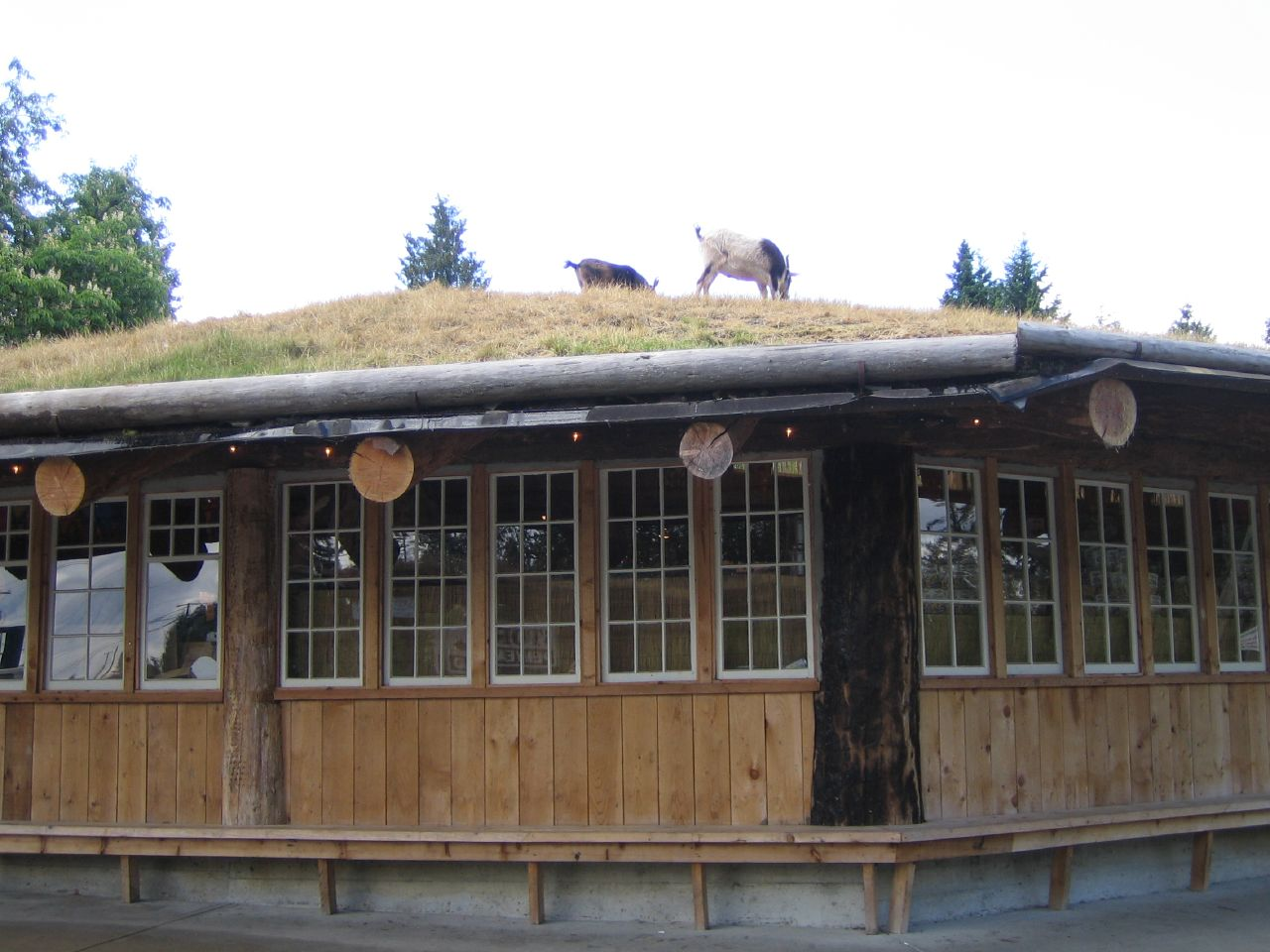
Goats on roof at Old Country Market in Coombs.

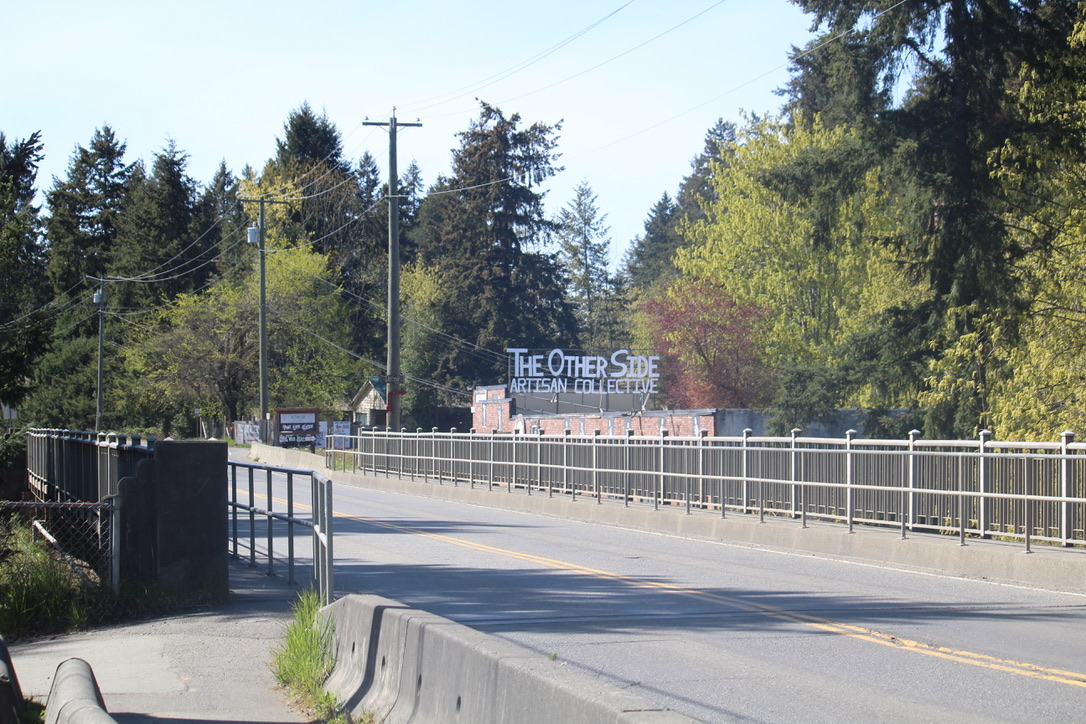
Coombs Bridge
