= Grasmere, British Columbia =

Coordinates: 49°06′05″N 115°05′11″W

Location of Grasmere in British Columbia

Grasmere, British Columbia, Canada elevation 869m, is a hamlet in the East Kootenay region of British Columbia within the Regional District of East Kootenay, British Columbia. It is located on the east side of Lake Koocanusa, below the mouth of the Elk River, and to the southeast of the city of Cranbrook, and 15 km north of the Canada–United States border and the state of Montana. The city of Fernie is located nearby further up the Elk River.

There are 150 people living in Grasmere, and most of them work in the adjacent mining, agricultural, or forestry sectors. Grasmere is located within the Galton mountain range of the Canadian Rockies. The area is served by one school, Grasmere Elementary School. The name of the community was provided by a student, Warren Lancaster, in a competition in the early 20th century. It is named after the town of Grasmere in northern England's Lake District.

== Climate ==
Grasmere has a warm summer humid continental climate, [Köppen Dfb]

Climate data for Grasmere
Month	Jan	Feb	Mar	Apr	May	Jun	Jul	Aug	Sep	Oct	Nov	Dec	Year
Record high °C (°F)	12.8 (55.0)	20 (68)	22.2 (72.0)	30 (86)	34.5 (94.1)	35.6 (96.1)	38.9 (102.0)	39.4 (102.9)	35.6 (96.1)	27.2 (81.0)	20.6 (69.1)	13.3 (55.9)	39.4 (102.9)
Mean daily maximum °C (°F)	−2 (28)	3.1 (37.6)	9.2 (48.6)	15 (59)	19.3 (66.7)	23 (73)	27.5 (81.5)	27.4 (81.3)	21 (70)	13.6 (56.5)	3.3 (37.9)	−1.7 (28.9)	13.2 (55.8)
Daily mean °C (°F)	−7.1 (19.2)	−3.9 (25.0)	0.6 (33.1)	6.7 (44.1)	11.9 (53.4)	16.1 (61.0)	19.1 (66.4)	18.8 (65.8)	13.1 (55.6)	7.1 (44.8)	−1.6 (29.1)	−7.6 (18.3)	6.1 (43.0)
Mean daily minimum °C (°F)	−9 (16)	−6.2 (20.8)	−2.3 (27.9)	0.6 (33.1)	4.4 (39.9)	7.1 (44.8)	10 (50)	9.8 (49.6)	4.5 (40.1)	0 (32)	−3.8 (25.2)	−8.4 (16.9)	0.6 (33.1)
Record low °C (°F)	−36 (−33)	−33 (−27)	−23.9 (−11.0)	−11 (12)	−6.1 (21.0)	−2 (28)	0 (32)	0 (32)	−7 (19)	−15.6 (3.9)	−32 (−26)	−42.8 (−45.0)	−42.8 (−45.0)
Average precipitation mm (inches)	43.8 (1.72)	31.4 (1.24)	26.1 (1.03)	37.7 (1.48)	79.3 (3.12)	68.4 (2.69)	65.1 (2.56)	51.6 (2.03)	37.6 (1.48)	23.8 (0.94)	45.4 (1.79)	42.3 (1.67)	552.4 (21.75)
Source: Environment Canada
