= Kutenai language =

Indigenous language of Montana, Idaho, and British Columbia

Kutenai
- Ktunaxa
- Native to: Canada, United States
- Region: British Columbia, Montana, Idaho
- Ethnicity: 1,536 Ktunaxa (2016 census)
- Native speakers: 60 (2021 census); 345 with some knowledge (2016)
- Language family: Language isolate
- Writing system: Latin (Kutenai alphabet)
- Signed forms: Ktunaxa Sign Language (ʔa·qanⱡiⱡⱡitnam)

Language codes
- ISO 639-2: kut
- ISO 639-3: kut
- Glottolog: kute1249
- ELP: Ktunaxa
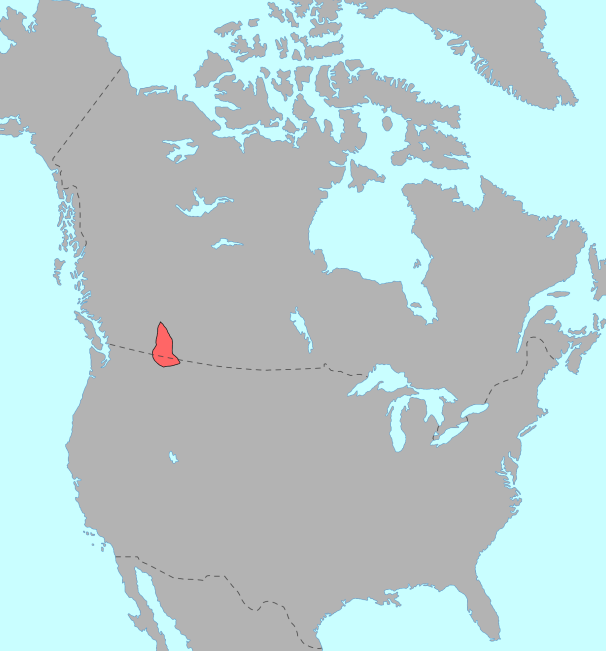
- Kutenai language

- Kutenai is classified as Severely Endangered by the UNESCO Atlas of the World's Languages in Danger.

- People: Ktunaxa
- Language: Ktunaxa, ʔa·qanⱡiⱡⱡitnam
- Country: Ktunaxa ʔamakʔis

Kutenai (/ˈkuːtniː/ KOOT-nee), also Kootenai, Kootenay, Ktunaxa, and Ksanka, is the native language of the Kutenai people of Montana and Idaho in the United States and British Columbia in Canada. It is typically considered a language isolate, unrelated to the Salishan family of languages spoken by neighboring tribes on the coast and in the interior Plateau. The Kutenai also use ʔa·qanⱡiⱡⱡitnam, Ktunaxa Sign Language.

== Classification ==
Kutenai is typically considered a language isolate. There have been attempts to place Kutenai in either a Macro-Algonquian or Macro-Salishan language family, most recently with Salish, but these claims are not generally accepted.

== Current status ==
In 1969, the Kutenai language was spoken by 446 registered Indians in Canada. As of 2021, Statistics Canada reported 210 Ktunaxa speakers. Referring to the Ktunaxa Nation Council (KNC) Traditional Knowledge and Language program findings, Ktunaxa scholar Christopher Horsethief stated that 24 fluent speakers remain and all are over the age of 65.

As of 2012, the Ktunaxa people in Canada are working on a language revitalization effort. Tribal councils from the separate communities of the Ktunaxa nation have contributed a selection of audio recordings of Kutenai words and phrases to the FirstVoices website, an online catalogue of the indigenous languages of North America. As of November 2017, the Ktunaxa webpage had 2500 words and 1114 phrases archived, stories and songs recorded, a language learning app available, and First Voices tutor. The FirstVoices Tutor provides lessons and practices in the given language. The Ktunaxa Language app, accessible for iOS and Android devices, is a Ktunaxa dictionary which uses the audio recordings of words and phrases, and provides flashcards with audio, of the vocabulary found on the FirstVoices website. The Ktunaxa nation aims to target younger generations with the FirstVoices materials to teach fluency in the Kutenai language.

One such example is the ʔAq̓am community of the Ktunaxa Nation, also known as St. Mary's band in Cranbrook, British Columbia, which has a private elementary school called the ʔaq̓amnik School. This school, as well as providing standard BC curriculum, teaches the Ktunaxa language and cultural traditions of the people to younger generations. It also has an after school program and a program called Headstart, which helps adults of children up to the age of six learn about teaching the Ktunaxa culture and language to their children.

The Confederated Salish and Kootenai Tribes of the Flathead Nation have founded the Salish Kootenai College, a tribal college on the Flathead reservation in Pablo, Montana. The college offers a certificate program in Native American studies, which requires that students have knowledge of the history and culture of the Salish and Ktunaxa people. The curriculum also offers classes in basic Kutenai language pronunciation and grammar. Some sources suggest that the knowledge and preservation of the native communities' culture will contribute to the preservation of the communities' language, but there is no evidence yet from the Salish Kootenai College to support this claim.

College of the Rockies main campus is in Cranbrook B.C on the territory of the Ktunaxa people. As such, the college has collaborated with the Ktunaxa people for 40 years as of 2015. As well as offering indigenous studies classes, the College of the Rockies offers basic Ktunaxa classes online, KTUN-101 and KTUN-102, using the FirstVoices website as the primary learning resource. They also offer a Ktunaxa Workshop for beginner learners providing basic phrases and pronunciation, and cultural information of the Ktunaxa people.

Through the use of social media, another example of Indigenous language revitalization efforts is the Instagram page KtunaxaPride created by Aiyana Twigg in the fall of 2020. Twigg, a Ktunaxa and Blackfoot student who recently graduated with a double major from her studies in First Nations and Endangered Languages and Anthropology from the University of British Columbia, stated that "this page will be dedicated to teaching, learning, and talking about the Ktunaxa language, culture, history, territory, and worldview of who we are as Ktunaxanin̓tik". While originally intended for the Ktunaxa community, the page has also inspired other Indigenous communities as well as non-Indigenous people to learn about Indigenous culture and language.

The wupnik' natanik site is an online social networking site designed to create a space to connect Ktunaxa community members with their language, culture, and history. Community engagement on this platform has resulted in improved access to Ktunaxa font resources for web publishing, and collaboration on identifying the place and subjects of Ktunaxa historical photos.

== Documentation ==
The first grammar of Kutenai was compiled by Roman Catholic missionary Philippo Canestrelli, and was published in 1894 in Latin.

In 1918, Franz Boas published The Kutenai Tales, a transcription and translation of multiple Ktunaxa stories. The stories were gathered by Alexander F. Pierce in 1891 and Boas in 1914, and told by members of the Ktunaxa people including Andrew Pierre, Numan Pierre, Joe Mission, Andrew Felix, and the major contributor from the community, a man referred to as Barnaby.

Paul L. Garvin did various descriptive work describing the phonemics, morphology, and syllabification in Ktunaxa. He also has two sources of transcriptions of speakers talking.

In 1991, Lawrence Richard Morgan wrote a description of the Kutenai Language as his PhD dissertation through the University of California, Berkeley. This description is focused on how the language works and specifically defining the working parts of the language. Morgan's work is an exhaustive list of each grammatical particle, morpheme, and affix, with their respective environments and their varying forms.

== Phonology ==
=== Consonant phonemes ===
Kutenai has no phonemic distinction between voiced and voiceless consonants.

		Labial	Dental		Palatal	Velar	Uvular	Glottal
		Labial	plain	sibilant	Palatal	Velar	Uvular	Glottal
Nasal	plain	m ⟨m⟩	n ⟨n⟩					
Nasal	glottalized	ˀm ⟨m̓⟩	ˀn ⟨n̓⟩					
Plosive/ Affricate	plain	p ⟨p⟩	t ⟨t⟩	t͡s ⟨ȼ⟩		k ⟨k⟩	q ⟨q⟩	ʔ ⟨ʔ⟩
Plosive/ Affricate	ejective	pʼ ⟨p̓⟩	tʼ ⟨t̓⟩	t͡sʼ ⟨ȼ̓⟩		kʼ ⟨k̓⟩	qʼ ⟨q̓⟩	
Fricative			ɬ ⟨ⱡ⟩	s ⟨s⟩			χ ⟨x⟩	h ⟨h⟩
Approximant					j ⟨y⟩	w ⟨w⟩		

=== Vowel phonemes ===
Vowel length in Ktunaxa is also contrastive, so two words can be differentiated just by lengthening or shortening a vowel. Some such minimal pairs are the verbal stem 'to dig something up' [ʔakaːkʼuː] and the noun '(steel animal) trap' [ʔaːkaːkʼuː] and the verbal stem for 'to fall out in this direction/to fall out from somewhere' [ʔakmuːxuː] and 'the place where (someone is) sitting, one's place at a table' [ʔaːkmuːxuː]. Both pairs differ only in the length of the first vowel, [a] vs [a:].

	Front	Back
High	i iː	u uː
Low	a aː	

== Typology ==
Like other languages in the area, Kutenai has a rich inventory of consonants and a small inventory of vowels, though there are allophones of the three basic phonemic vowels. The lack of a phonemic distinction between voiced and voiceless consonants is much as in other languages of the area. Because Kutenai is on the periphery of this linguistic area, the loss of a rich lateral inventory is consistent with other nearby languages, which now have only one or two lateral consonants. One such language group contains the Sahaptian languages, which have had a similar loss of laterals. Nez Perce has /ts/, believed to be the lateral affricate in the proto-language. Nez Perce, like Kutenai, lies in the eastern periphery of the Northwest Linguistic area.

Another typological analysis investigates the lexical category of preverbs in Kutenai. This lexical category distinguishes neighboring Algonquian languages, found to the east of the Kootenay Rocky Mountains and near the Kutenai linguistic area. Another typological relationship Kutenai could have is the presence of its obviation system.

== Orthography ==
Kutenai is written in the Kutenai alphabet, which is derived from the Latin alphabet.

== Grammar ==
In general terms, Kutenai is an agglutinative language, with many grammatical functions being served by both prefixes and suffixes, primarily on the verb, though some affixes select nouns as well. As mentioned above, a distinctive feature of Kutenai is its use of an obviation system as a way to track which entities and concepts are particularly central/salient to a story being told and as a grammatical way of clarifying the roles of each entity in sentences with two third-person arguments: "Pronouns, nouns, verbs, and adverbs all take obviative markers", making it particularly different from some more well-known obviation systems (like the Algonquian one, which allows for obviation only on third-person animate nouns). Kutenai also makes use of an inverse system." The language has an overt copula, ʔin 'to be'.

=== Syntax ===
==== Word order ====
Word order in Kutenai can be flexible in response to discourse and pragmatic concerns. As is the case with many head-marking languages, it is rare to have both an overt subject and an overt object in a sentence since the morphology of the verb makes it clear who is acting on whom. Morgan states that if it is appropriate to express both arguments of a verb in a "neutral" context, VOS word order is preferred; however, it also alternates with VSO order. The pre-verbal position can be occupied by adverbs, as seen in these three examples:

qa·kiⱡ hiȼ'kiⱡ -ni hukiʔ -s tiⱡna
ADV search -IND louse/lice -OBV {old woman}
The old lady started looking for lice.

pikʔak -s naqaʔi -ni titkat' qakⱡik xaxa -s
{long ag}o OBV exist -IND man called crow -OBV
Long ago there was a man named 'Xaxa' (or Crow).

is -iⱡ ȼⱡakiⱡ -ni xaxa naʔuti -s
very PVB like -IND crow girl -OBV
Crow loves Naʔuti.

One aspect of Kutenai that complicates word order somewhat is the fact that the verb is marked for first- or second-person subjects by "affixal or clitic pronouns" that precede the stem, hu/hun for 'I' and hin for 'you'. It is common in the orthography to write the pronouns as separate words, making it seem as if the word order is Subject Pronoun + Verb (+ Object).

==== Inverse ====
In many languages, conditions for inverse include situations in which the first or second person is in the "object" role, and the third person is the "subject" as in 'She saw you/me.' In Kutenai, however, the situations use specific "first-/second-person object" morphology, separate from the inverse. As a consequence, Kutenai's inverse system is most clearly observable in interactions between third persons. The following two examples (from Dryer 1991) show the direct and inverse, respectively:

wu·kat -i paⱡkiy -s titqat'
see -IND woman OBV man
The man saw the woman.

wu·kat -aps -i titqat' -s paⱡkiy
see -INV -IND man -OBV woman
The (obviative) man saw the (proximate) woman.

==== Clause typing ====
Kutenai subordinate/dependent clauses are marked with a k and a lack of indicative morphology on the verb, as are questions, nominalizations, and relative clauses. The k can cliticize to the material that follows it, as can be seen in this example.

wu·kat -i titqat' -s k- was- aqna -p -s
see -IND man OBV SUB- quick do -IN OBV
He saw a man doing something in a hurry. (He saw him, a man that he does something quickly.)

== See also ==
- Kootenays
- Salish Kootenai College

== Bibliography ==
- Campbell, Lyle (1997). American Indian languages: The historical linguistics of Native America. New York: Oxford University Press. ISBN 0-19-509427-1.
- Dryer, Matthew S (1991). "Subject and inverse in Kutenai". Proceedings of the Hokan-Penutian Workshop. American Indian Languages Conferences. Occasional papers in linguistics. Vol. 16. University of California, Santa Cruz. pp. 183–202.
- Dryer, Matthew S. (1992). "A comparison of the obviation systems of Kutenai and Algonquian". Papers of the 23rd Algonquian Conference.
- Dryer, Matthew S. (2002). Pentland, David (ed.). "A Comparison of Preverbs in Kutenai and Algonquian". Proceedings of the Thirtieth Algonquian Conference. 30. Winnipeg: University of Manitoba: 63–94.
- Dryer, Matthew S. (2007). Wolfart, H. C. (ed.). "Kutenai, Algonquian, and the Pacific Northwest from an areal perspective". Proceedings of the Thirty-Eighth Algonquian Conference. Winnipeg: University of Manitoba: 155–206. ISSN 0831-5671.
- Garvin, Paul (1947). "Christian Names in Kutenai". International Journal of American Linguistics. 13 (2): 69–77. doi:10.1086/463931.
- Garvin, Paul (1948a). "Kutenai Lexical Innovations". Word. 4 (2): 120–126. doi:10.1080/00437956.1948.11659334.
- Garvin, Paul (1948b). "Kutenai I: Phonemics". International Journal of American Linguistics. 14: 37–42. doi:10.1086/463977.
- Garvin, Paul (1948c). "Kutenai II: Morpheme Variation". International Journal of American Linguistics. 14 (2): 87–90. doi:10.1086/463987.
- Garvin, Paul (1948d). "Kutenai III: Morpheme Distributions (prefix, theme, suffix)". International Journal of American Linguistics. 14 (3): 171–178. doi:10.1086/463999.
- Garvin, Paul (1951a). "Kutenai IV: Word Classes". International Journal of American Linguistics. 17 (2): 84–97. doi:10.1086/464111.
- Garvin, Paul (1951b). "L'obviation en Kutenai: échantillon d'une catégorie grammaticale amérindienne". Bulletin de la Société de Linguistique de Paris (in French). 47: 166–212.
- Garvin, Paul (1953). "Short Kutenai Texts". International Journal of American Linguistics. 19 (4): 305–311. doi:10.1086/464238.
- Garvin, Paul (1954). "Colloquial Kutenai Text: Conversation II". International Journal of American Linguistics. 20 (4): 316–334. doi:10.1086/464295.
- Horsethief, Christopher (2012). "Re-differentiation as collective intelligence: The Ktunaxa language online community". Proceedings of Collective Intelligence Conference. arXiv:1204.3891.
- Mithun, Marianne (1999). The Languages of Native North America. Cambridge: Cambridge University Press. ISBN 0-521-23228-7.
- Morgan, Lawrence Richard (1991). A Description of the Kutenai Language (Thesis). Berkeley: University of California. OCLC 27109565.
- “Mentor-Apprentice Program.” First Peoples Cultural Council, 22 Oct. 2026, fpcc.ca/program/mentor-apprentice-program/.
- Report on the Status of B.C. First Nations Languages Third Edition, 2018, fpcc.ca/wp-content/uploads/2020/07/FPCC-LanguageReport-180716-WEB.pdf.
- “This Teacher Is Revitalizing an Endangered Language Spoken by Only 215 People in Canada | CBC News.” CBCnews, CBC/Radio Canada, 5 Jan. 2023, www.cbc.ca/news/canada/british-columbia/ktunaxa-holidays-greeting-revitalization-1.6695761.
