= National Register of Historic Places listings in Boundary County, Idaho =

Location of Boundary County in Idaho

This is a list of the National Register of Historic Places listings in Boundary County, Idaho.

This is intended to be a complete list of the properties and districts on the National Register of Historic Places in Boundary County, Idaho, United States. Latitude and longitude coordinates are provided for many National Register properties and districts; these locations may be seen together in a map.

There are 9 properties and districts listed on the National Register in the county. More may be added; properties and districts nationwide are added to the Register weekly.

This National Park Service list is complete through NPS recent listings posted September 4, 2026.

== Current listings ==
	Name on the Register	Image	Date listed	Location	City or town	Description
1	Boundary County Courthouse	Boundary County Courthouse	September 27, 1987 (#87001581)	Kootenai St. 48°41′45″N 116°18′50″W	Bonners Ferry	
2	Fry's Trading Post	Fry's Trading Post	September 7, 1984 (#84001104)	Off U.S. Route 95; 48°42′00″N 116°18′59″W	Bonners Ferry	Destroyed by fire.
3	Harvey Mountain Quarry	Harvey Mountain Quarry	June 23, 1978 (#78001053)	Address restricted	Bonners Ferry	
4	North Side School	North Side School	May 5, 1992 (#92000417)	218 W. Comanche St. 48°42′11″N 116°18′56″W	Bonners Ferry	
5	Snyder Guard Station Historical District	Snyder Guard Station Historical District	August 19, 1983 (#83000283)	South of Eastport on United States Forest Service Road 211; 48°53′04″N 116°10′12″W	Eastport	
6	Russell and Pearl Soderling House	Russell and Pearl Soderling House	January 15, 1998 (#97001650)	217 W. Madison St. 48°41′28″N 116°19′09″W	Bonners Ferry	
7	Spokane & International Railroad Construction Camp	Spokane & International Railroad Construction Camp	June 23, 1994 (#94000630)	East of U.S. Route 95 along the Spokane International railroad tracks, 2 miles (3.2 km) south of the Canada–US border 48°57′58″N 116°10′12″W	Eastport	
8	U.S. Inspection Station – Porthill, Idaho	U.S. Inspection Station – Porthill, Idaho	May 22, 2014 (#14000252)	Idaho Highway 1; 48°59′59″N 116°29′54″W	Porthill	
9	U.S. Post Office – Bonners Ferry Main	U.S. Post Office – Bonners Ferry Main	March 16, 1989 (#89000129)	7167 1st St. 48°41′47″N 116°18′47″W	Bonners Ferry	

== See also ==
- List of National Historic Landmarks in Idaho
- National Register of Historic Places listings in Idaho
