= Spokane & International Railroad Construction Camp =

- U.S. National Register of Historic Places

- Location within Idaho Location within the United States
- Location: East of U.S. Route 95 along the Spokane International railroad tracks, 2 miles (3.2 km) south of the Canada–US border, in vicinity of Eastport in Boundary County, Idaho
- Coordinates: 48°57′58″N 116°10′12″W
- Area: 1 acre (0.40 ha)
- Built: 1905
- NRHP reference No.: 94000630
- Added to NRHP: June 23, 1994

The Spokane & International Railroad Construction Camp near Eastport, Idaho dates from 1905 when grading and construction of the Spokane & International Railroad began in this area. The railroad became operational in 1906. The site was listed on the National Register of Historic Places in 1994.

It was a construction camp on the Spokane & International Railroad, which later became part of the Burlington Northern Railroad. It has also been known as Chinese Ovens site (10-BY-372) and also as site IHSI 21-15699.

The listed area included two contributing structures and six contributing sites.

It was the location of institutional housing.
