= Moyie River =

Long tributary of the Kootenai River

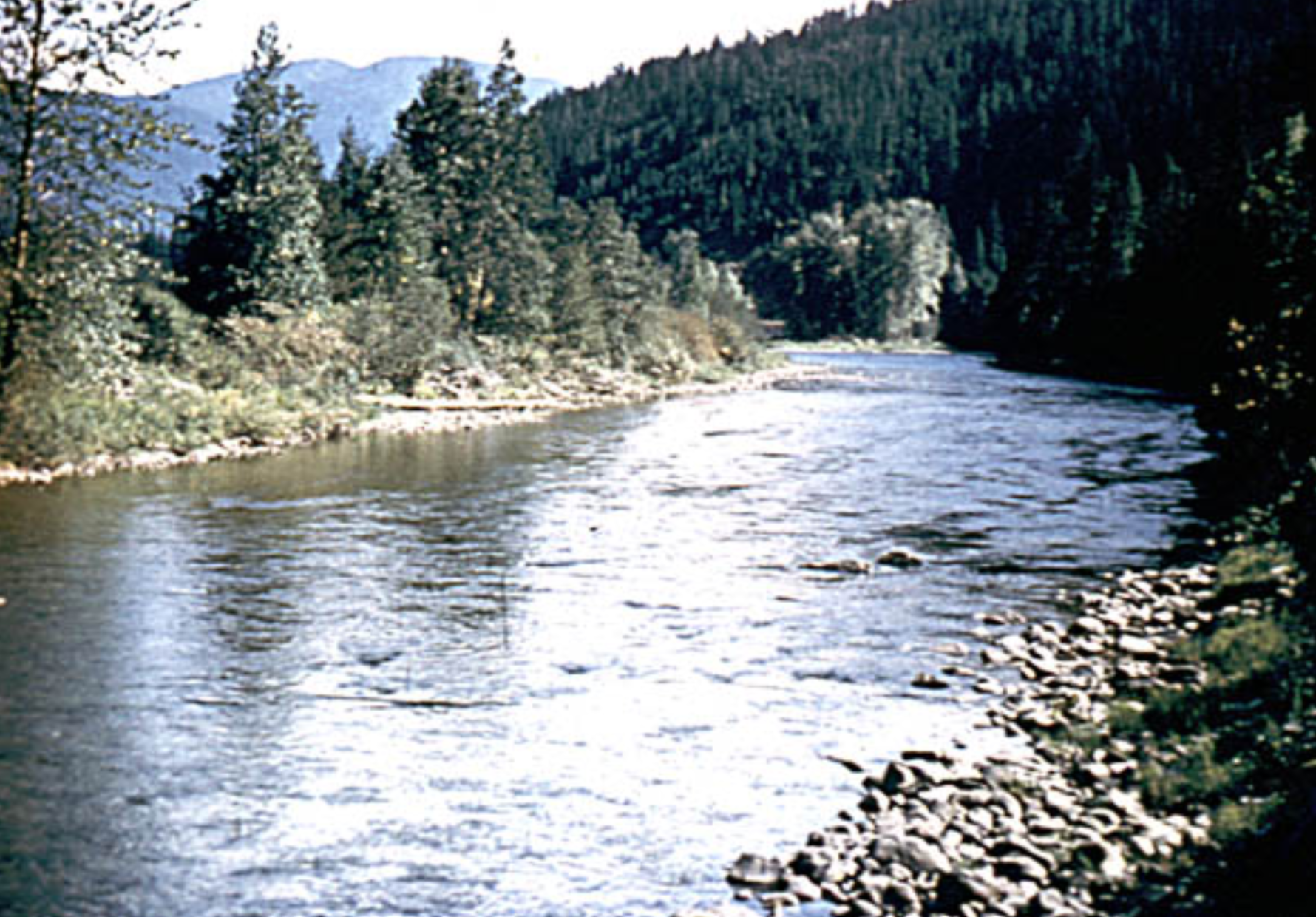
- Moyie River at Eastport, Idaho

- Location of the mouth of the Moyie River in Idaho Moyie River (the United States)

Location
- Country: United States, Canada
- State: Idaho
- Province: British Columbia

Physical characteristics
- Mouth: Kootenay River
  - location: Moyie Springs, Idaho
  - coordinates: 48°59′59″N 116°10′51″W
  - elevation: 1,768 ft (539 m)
- Length: 92 mi (148 km)
- Basin size: 208 sq mi (540 km^{2})
- Discharge
  - location: near Eastport, ID
  - average: 685 cu ft/s (19.4 m^{3}/s)
  - minimum: 23 cu ft/s (0.65 m^{3}/s)
  - maximum: 8,930 cu ft/s (253 m^{3}/s)

Basin features
- Tributaries
  - right: Little Moyie River

The Moyie River is a 92-mile (148 km) long tributary of the Kootenai River (spelled Kootenay River in Canada) in the U.S. state of Idaho and the Canadian province of British Columbia. The Moyie River is part of the Columbia River basin, being a tributary of the Kootenay River, which is a tributary to the Columbia River.

== Course ==
The Moyie River originates in southeast British Columbia. It flows northeast and east, collecting many headwater streams, before turning south and entering Moyie Lake. The river exits Moyie Lake to the south, flowing south and west by the village of Yahk, British Columbia, and Yahk Provincial Park before entering Idaho at Kingsgate, British Columbia, and Eastport, Idaho.

In Idaho, the Moyie River flows nearly due south, emptying into the Kootenai River near Moyie Springs, Idaho, several miles east of Bonners Ferry, Idaho. Near its mouth, the Moyie River tumbles over Moyie Falls. Near the falls is Moyie Dam, constructed in 1949.

The river has several oddly named pairs of tributaries. South of Moyie Lake the river collects the tributaries of Sunrise Creek and then Sundown Creek. Farther south, it collects Irishman Creek and then Englishman Creek. At Yahk, Hawkins Creek joins the Moyie River. Hawkins Creek has two tributaries that begin in the United States and flow north into Canada: Canuck Creek and America Creek. Another odd name occurring along the river is the town of Good Grief, Idaho.

The river is paralleled by the Crowsnest Highway in British Columbia, and, briefly, U.S. Route 95 in Idaho. The river is also paralleled by railroads: the Union Pacific in Idaho and the Canadian Pacific in British Columbia.

In Idaho, the Moyie River and its tributaries lie almost entirely within Kaniksu National Forest.

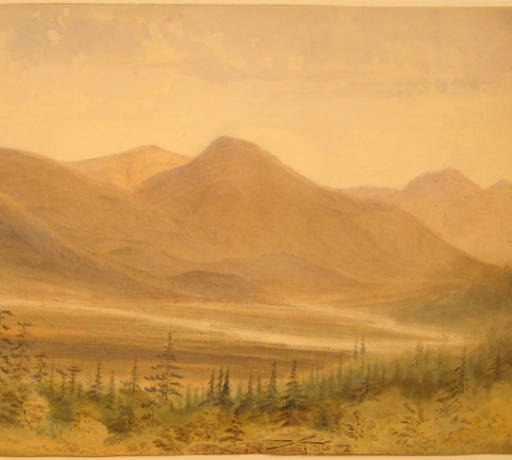
Valley of the Moyie River

== Natural history ==
Moyie Falls, near the mouth of the river, effectively blocks the migration of fish. In addition, various dams on the Kootenay River block fish migration. There are resident Kokanee salmon in the upper Moyie River and in Moyie Lake. These were introduced during the 1940s and since then naturalized.

== History ==
According to British Columbia's Geographical Names Information System, the word "Moyie" is a corruption of the French "mouiller" or "mouillé", a name given by fur trappers referring to the wet conditions, also described by David Thompson in 1808. Thompson called the river "McDonald's River". Governor Simpson called it "Grand Quête River". Captain Palliser called it "Choe-coos River". The name "Moyie" was originally pronounced "moo-YAY", indicating its French origin, but today is commonly pronounced "mo-YAY". In 1923 the Eileen dam (previously known as the Moyie dam) was constructed where Skin Creek enters the river about five miles upstream of Moyie Falls. It was anchored to a weak rock structure which washed away in 1925 due to flooding. The arch still remains intact.

According to the USGS, variant names for the Moyie River include: Methow, Mojie, Mooyie, and Moyea.

== Recreation ==
The Moyie River has multiple recreation opportunities including camping, hunting, fishing, hiking, gold panning, canoeing, kayaking and white water rafting. At this time, recreational boaters do not need a permit to float the Moyie River. Information about current water flows is available through the United States Geological Survey.

== Water quality ==
An analysis of 11 years of results from a water quality monitoring station on the Moyie River near Kingsgate just north of the Canadian border stated that the river's water quality was "generally good", but with some metal levels exceeding provincial limits during freshets (high water events on a river resulting from snow and river ice melting or from heavy rain). E.coli and fecal coliform measurements indicated that the river's water could not be used for drinking water without filtration and disinfection. Other reports about water quality at that location have also been published.

== See also ==
- List of rivers in Idaho
- List of longest streams of Idaho
- List of rivers of British Columbia
- Moyie Falls
- Moyie River Canyon Bridge
- Tributaries of the Columbia River
