= Fletcher Martin =

American painter, illustrator, muralist and educator

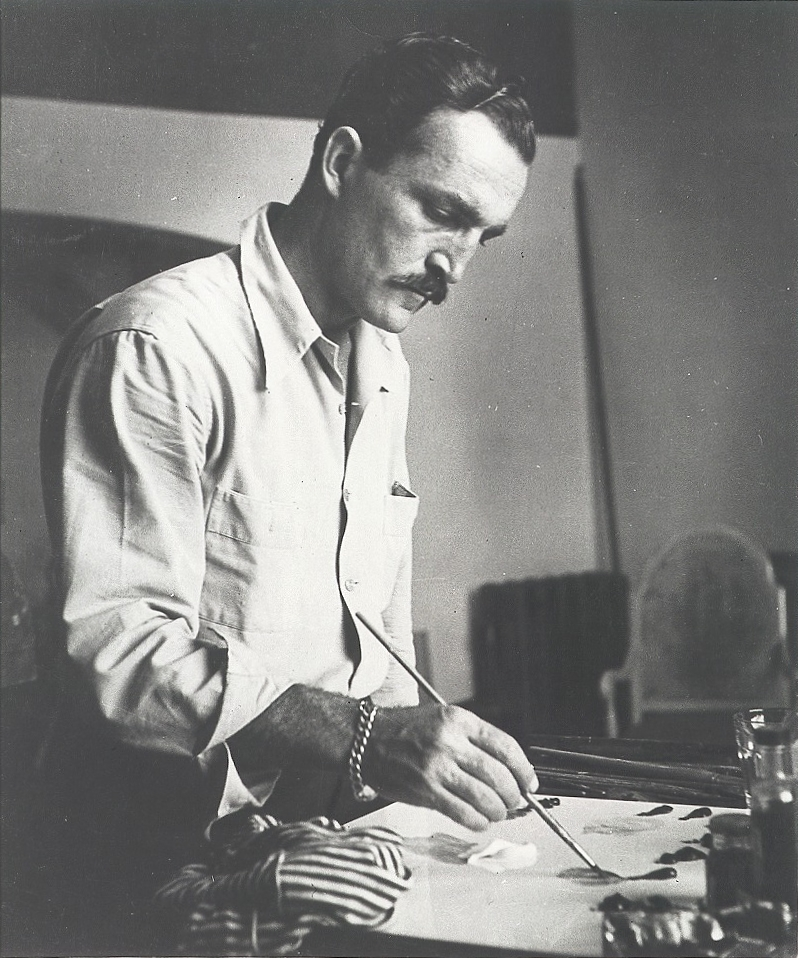
Fletcher Martin at work in his studio, circa 1945

Fletcher Martin (April 19, 1904 – May 30, 1979) was an American painter, illustrator, muralist and educator. He is best known for his images of military life during World War II and his sometimes brutal images of boxing and other sports.

== Early life ==
Martin was born in 1904 in Palisade, Colorado, one of seven children of newspaperman Clinton Martin and his wife Josephine. The family relocated to Idaho and later Washington. By the age of twelve he was working as a printer. He dropped out of high school and held odd jobs such as lumberjack and professional boxer. He served in the U.S. Navy from 1922 to 1926. His artistic skills were largely self-taught.

== Career ==
Martin worked as a printer in Los Angeles in the late 1920s, and as an assistant to Mexican muralist David Alfaro Siqueiros in the early 1930s. He taught at local art schools such as Otis Art Institute.

He won commissions to paint murals for the New Deal's Section of Painting and Sculpture, including Mail Transportation (1938), painted for the San Pedro Federal Building and Post Office in Los Angeles. Under the WPA he painted a mural study for the Kellogg, Idaho post office titled Mine Rescue (1939). Local industrialists objected that it depicted the dangers of mining, while officials of the Mine & Smelt Workers Union praised it. The industrialists prevailed and Martin painted an uncontroversial mural, Discovery (1941), depicting the prospector who founded the town. The rejected mural study is now in the Smithsonian American Art Museum. Perhaps his most ambitious mural, also done under the WPA, was painted for North Hollywood High School in Los Angeles. Legends of Fernandino and Gabrileno Indians (1937) depicts overlapping scenes of Native American life and ritual, and the world being carried on the backs of giants.

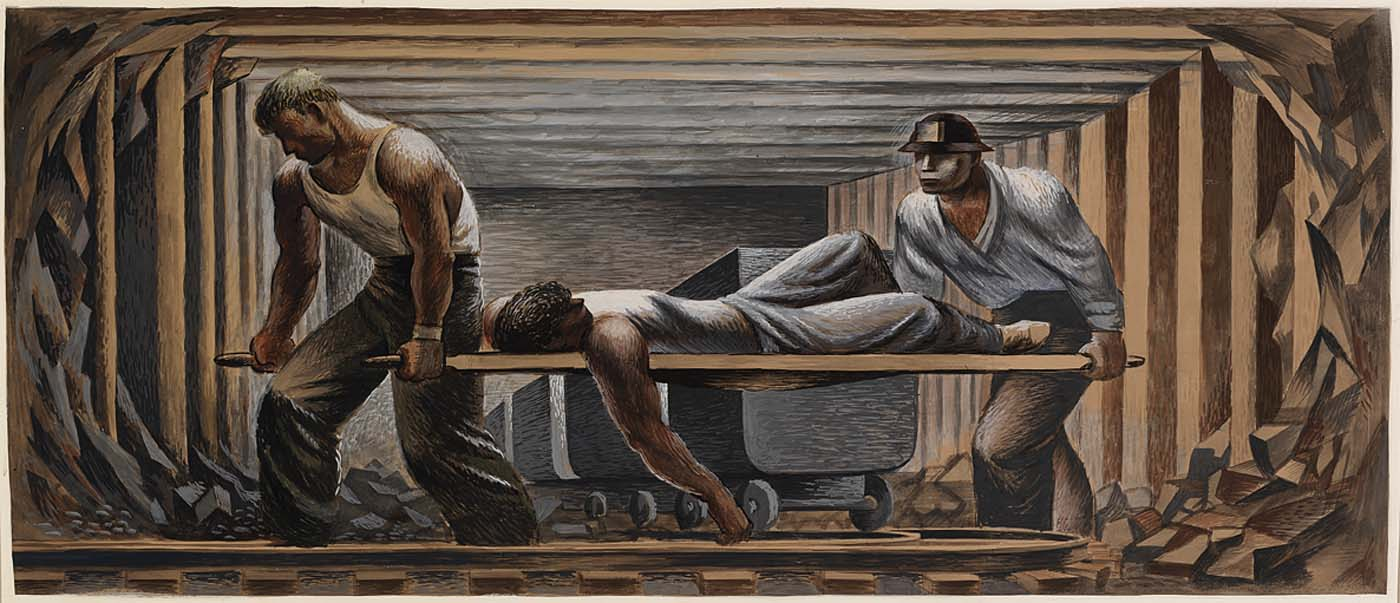
Study for Mine Rescue (1939), Smithsonian American Art Museum

As an artist-correspondent for Life Magazine during World War II, Martin made hundreds of sketches of U.S. soldier life. Fourteen of his paintings from the North African campaign were published in the December 27, 1943, issue of Life, and brought him national recognition. Among these was Boy Picking Flowers, Tunisia, depicting a young GI finding a distraction from war. He also made illustrations of wartime London and the June 1944 Normandy Invasion.

Martin's paintings often depicted men in conflict. Trouble in Frisco (1938, Museum of Modern Art) shows a brawl between longshoremen witnessed through a ship's porthole. The Undefeated (1948–49, St. Petersburg Museum of Fine Arts) depicts the 11th round of the June 25, 1948, World heavyweight boxing championship. The title is ironic: its subject is a severely battered Jersey Joe Walcott, collapsed against the referee and about to lose to (an unseen) Joe Louis. In 1954 he painted a series of illustrations for Sports Illustrated of heavyweight champion Rocky Marciano defending his title against Ezzard Charles.

Many of Martin's most popular works were reproduced as woodcuts, lithographs or silkscreens. After the war he taught at the Art Students League Summer School in Woodstock, New York, settled in the town, and began raising a family. He experimented with abstractionism and began painting naïve images of women and children.

During his career he was a visiting instructor or artist-in-residence at the University of Florida, State University of Iowa, the University of Minnesota, San Antonio Art Institute, and Washington State University. He received prizes from the Los Angeles County Museum of Art in 1935 (for Rural Family) and 1939 (for A Lad from the Fleet); the 1947 Lippincott Prize from the Pennsylvania Academy of the Fine Arts (for Dancer Dressing); and the 1949 Altman Prize from the National Academy of Design (for Cherry Twice). He was elected an associate of the National Academy of Design in 1969, and a full academician in 1974.

Lots of students get trapped in the effort to be original. After fifty million paintings have been painted you can see that it is impossible to be highly original. There is always precedent. Who would want to be that original anyway? A better intent is to see that one's work is truly one's own — an honest expression of deep personal feelings. The whole history of art, which can't help but affect one, will be filtered through your own personality to produce a sort of original statement.

— Fletcher Martin.

== Personal life ==
Martin married five times; four marriages ended in divorce. His wives were: first, poet Cecile Boot (married November 1925, divorced ?); second, script writer Henriette Lichtenstein (married 1935, divorced 1941); third, nurse Maxine Ferris (married 1941, divorced 1945); fourth, actress Helen Donovan (married February 1946, with whom he had sons Donovan, Clinton and Robin, divorced 1961); fifth, novelist Jean Sigsbee Small (married 1962). He had a much-publicized relationship with movie star Sylvia Sidney, and painted two portraits of her. He and Small retired to Guanajuato, Mexico in 1967, where they lived until his death in 1979.

== Selected works ==
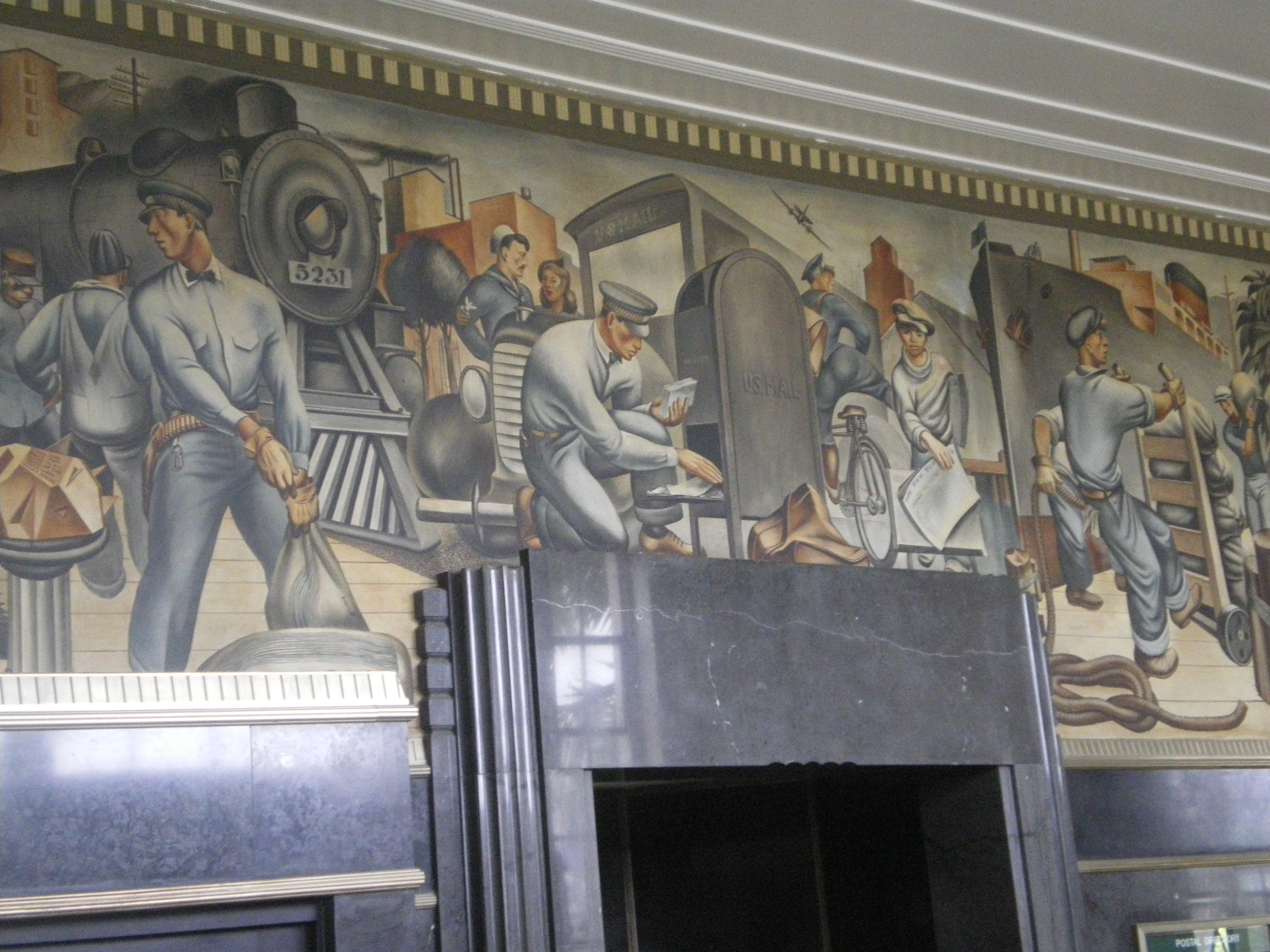
Mail Transportation (1938), San Pedro Post Office, Los Angeles, California.

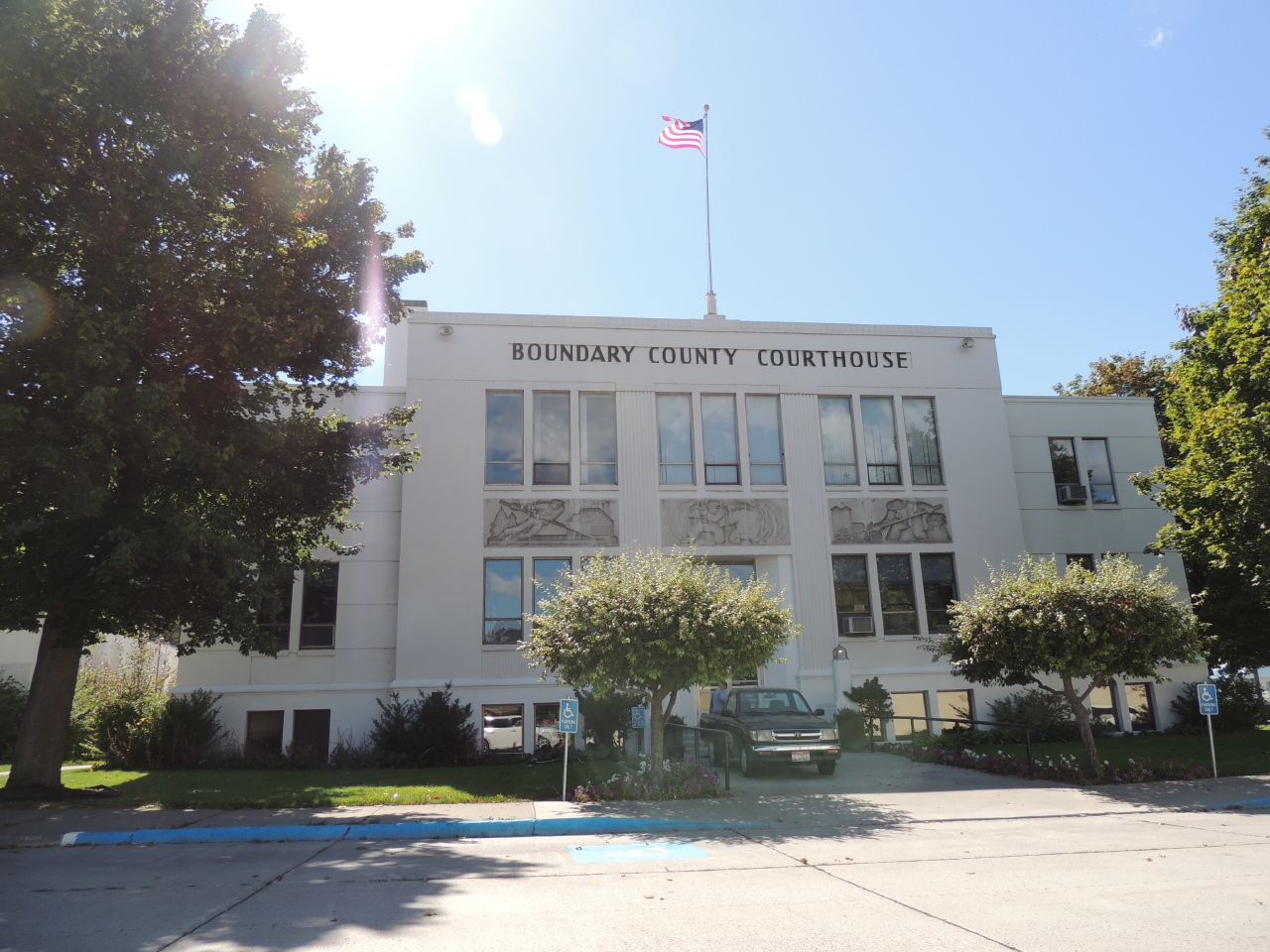
Boundary County Courthouse, Bonners Ferry, Idaho. Martin designed the 1940 bas relief panels on the façade.

=== Paintings ===
- The Wharf (1933), Georgia Museum of Art, Athens, Georgia.
- A Lad from the Fleet (1935), Hilbert Museum, Chapman University, Orange, California.
- "Down for the Count" (1936–37), Blanton Museum of Art, The University of Texas at Austin
- Bucolic Breakfast (1938), Hilbert Museum, Chapman University, Orange, California.
- Trouble in Frisco (1938), Museum of Modern Art, New York City.
- Tomorrow and Tomorrow (1939), Carleton College, Northfield, Minnesota.
- Celebration (1939), Nelson-Atkins Museum, Kansas City, Missouri.
- July 4, 5th & 6th (Sun Valley Rodeo) (1940), Denver Art Museum, Denver, Colorado. Depicts a cowboy wrestling a steer as a rodeo clown leaps out of the way.
- Air Raid (1940), Los Angeles County Museum of Art, California.
- Black King (1942), private collection.
- Lullaby (1942), private collection. Depicts a boxer who has just been knocked out. This set an auction record for Martin when it sold at Christie's New York for $107,000 in 1997.
- The Gamblers (1943), Oakland Museum of California.
- Battle of Hill 609, Tunisia (1943), U.S. Army Center of Military History, Washington, D.C.
- Boy Picking Flowers, Tunisia (1943), U.S. Army Center of Military History, Washington, D.C.
- The Subway Sleepers (1944). Depicts Londoners camped out on a subway platform to escape German V-2 bombs.
- Portrait of Charles Laughton as Captain Kidd (1945). Painted for a Life article on the film Captain Kidd.
- Urchin's Game (1946), Allentown Art Museum, Allentown, Pennsylvania.
- Cherry Twice (Double Portrait of Herman Cherry) (1947), Whitney Museum of American Art, New York City. Won the 1949 Altman Prize from the National Academy of Design.
- The Undefeated (1948–49), Museum of Fine Arts, St. Petersburg, Florida.
- Bullfight (1956), Butler Institute of American Art, Youngstown, Ohio.
- Flame Pit, Kennedy Space Center (1970), Smithsonian National Air and Space Museum, Washington, D.C.
- Inside the Turbine, Grand Coulee Dam (1972), U.S. Department of the Interior Museum, Washington, D.C.

=== Murals ===
- Legends of Fernandino and Gabrileno Indians (1937), North Hollywood High School, Los Angeles, California.
- Mail Transportation (1938), San Pedro Federal Building and Post Office, Los Angeles, California.
- Study for Mine Rescue (1939), Smithsonian American Art Museum, Washington, D.C.
- The Horse Breakers (1940), Lamesa Post Office, Lamesa, Texas.
- Discovery (1941), Kellogg Post Office, Kellogg, Idaho.

=== Drawings ===
- Juliet (1939), Metropolitan Museum of Art, New York City.
- The Scream (1943), Metropolitan Museum of Art, New York City.
- Nurse with Wounded Soldier (1943), Norman Rockwell Museum, Stockbridge, Massachusetts. Study for the December 27, 1943, cover of Life.
- Study for The Brothers (1950), Addison Gallery of American Art, Exeter, New Hampshire.

=== Sculpture ===
- Bas relief panels: Logging, Mining, Farming (1940), façade of Boundary County Courthouse, Bonners Ferry, Idaho.

=== Book illustrations ===
- Bret Harte, Tales of the Gold Rush, Heritage Press, 1944.
- Charles Nordhoff & James Norman Hall, Mutiny on the Bounty, Limited Editions Club, 1947.
- Jack London, The Sea Wolf, Limited Editions Club, 1961.
- Upton Sinclair, The Jungle, Heritage Press, 1965.
- John Steinbeck, Of Mice and Men, Heritage Press, 1970.
