= Moyie River Canyon Bridge =

Bridge in Bonners Ferry, Idaho

Moyie River Bridge
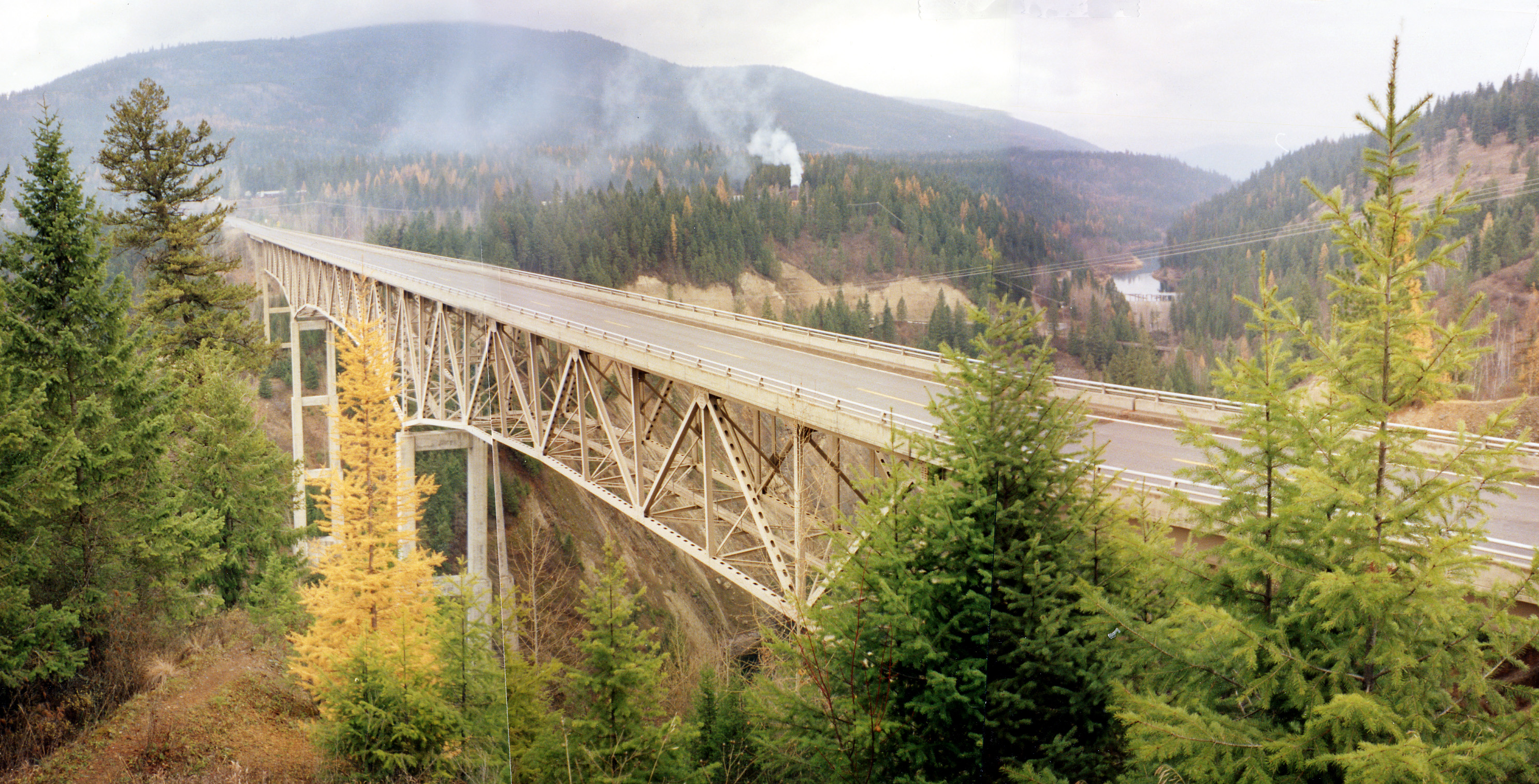
- Coordinates: 48°43′47″N 116°10′49″W
- Carries: 2 lanes of US 2
- Crosses: Moyie River
- Locale: Moyie Springs, Idaho
- Official name: Moyie River Canyon Bridge
- Maintained by: Idaho Transportation Department
- ID number: 10035

Characteristics
- Design: Steel truss - Deck
- Total length: 1,223 ft (373 m)
- Height: 464 ft (141 m)
- Longest span: 377 ft (115 m)
- Clearance below: 424 ft (129 m)

History
- Opened: 1965; 60 years ago

The Moyie River Canyon Bridge is a structural steel truss cantilever bridge that spans the Moyie River in the city of Moyie Springs just east of Bonners Ferry, Idaho. Constructed in 1965, the bridge is on U.S. Route 2 at mile marker 70. The bridge is 1,223 ft (373 m) long and 464 ft (141 m) high, and is a replacement for an obsolete 1923 bridge built downstream from Moyie Dam.

The only higher bridges in Idaho are the Dent Suspension Bridge (500' tall) and Perrine Bridge (486' tall).
