= Snyder Guard Station Historical District =

Historic district in Idaho, United States

- U.S. National Register of Historic Places
- U.S. Historic district
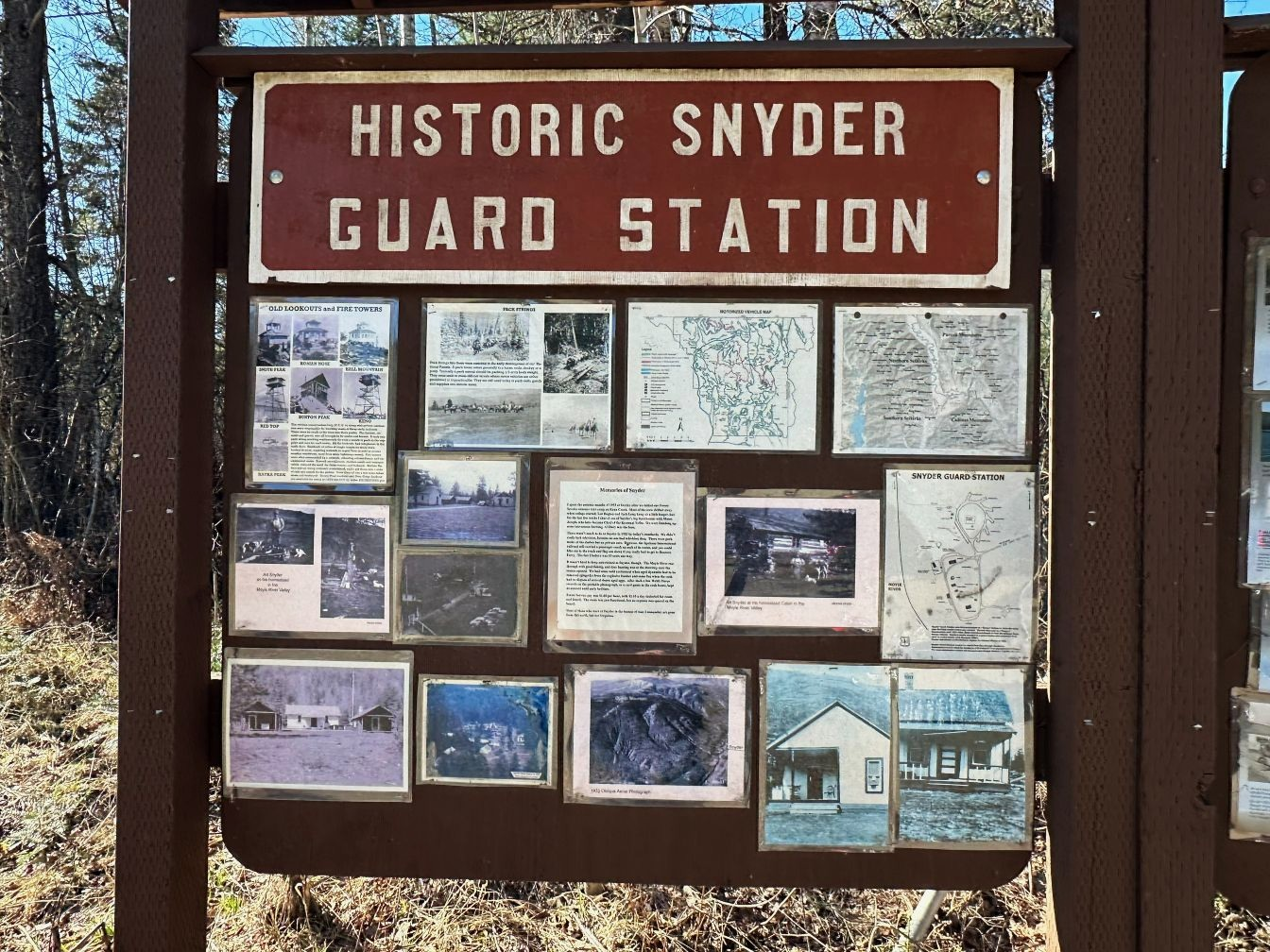
- Snyder Guard Station informational sign

- Location within Idaho Location within the United States
- Location: South of Eastport, Idaho on Forest Service Road 211, in Kaniksu National Forest
- Coordinates: 48°53′5″N 116°10′7″W
- Area: 7.4 acres (3.0 ha)
- Built: 1908, ca. 1918, 1935, other dates
- NRHP reference No.: 83000283
- Added to NRHP: August 19, 1983

The Snyder Guard Station by the Moyie River in Kaniksu National Forest, in the vicinity of Eastport, Idaho, dates from 1908. A historic district encompassing the station was listed on the National Register of Historic Places as Snyder Guard Station Historical District in 1983. The listed area included nine contributing buildings.

The ranger's house was constructed in 1908. It is a one-story six room 42.5 by 24.5 feet (13.0 m × 7.5 m) frame house built on a concrete foundation. It has a gable roof covered by wooden shingles and it has two brick chimneys. Two other dwellings, a meat house, a cook house, a wash house/workshop, a warehouse/office, and other structures were built later.

The NRHP nomination states the listed area was 28 acres (11 ha); NRIS gives 7.4 acres (3.0 ha) as its size.
