= Moyie Dam =

Dam in Boundary County, Idaho, United States

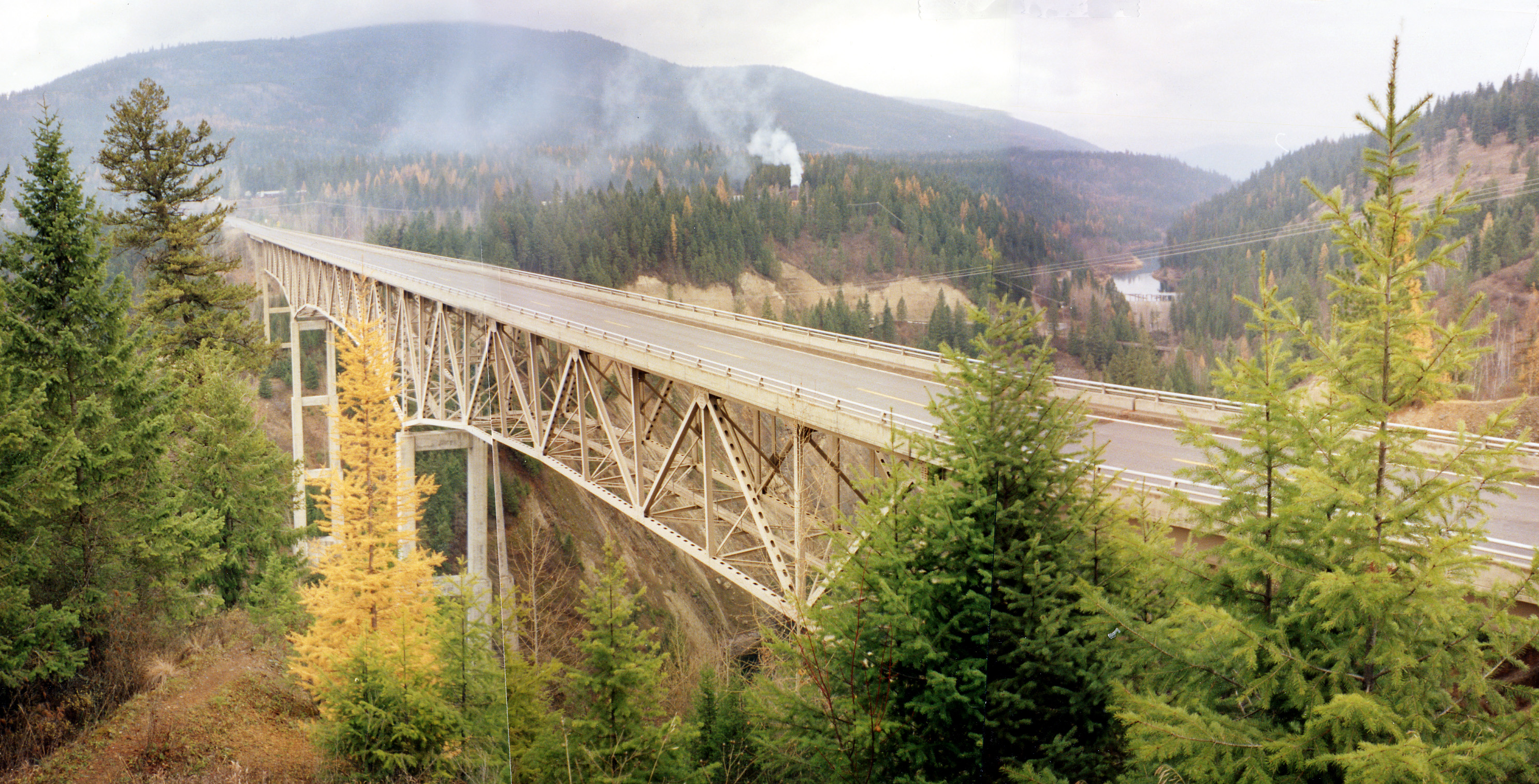
The Moyie River Canyon Bridge, with Moyie Dam visible in background to the north

Moyie Dam is a dam on the Moyie River in Boundary County, Idaho, United States.

The current 92 feet (28 m) high concrete gravity dam was built in 1950, and is owned and operated by the city of Bonners Ferry, Idaho. The city acquired its own hydroelectric facilities in 1921 and expanded several times; three powerhouses about 1,000 feet (300 m) downstream were built in 1921, 1941, and 1982, and their combined output totals just under 4 megawatts. As of 1984 Bonners Ferry was one of only three Idaho cities with its own municipally owned hydropower source, and the city ran it at a small profit returned to its general fund.

The dam creates a small, unnamed riverine reservoir on the Moyie, holding about 540 acre-feet (670,000 m^{3}).

== Eileen Dam ==
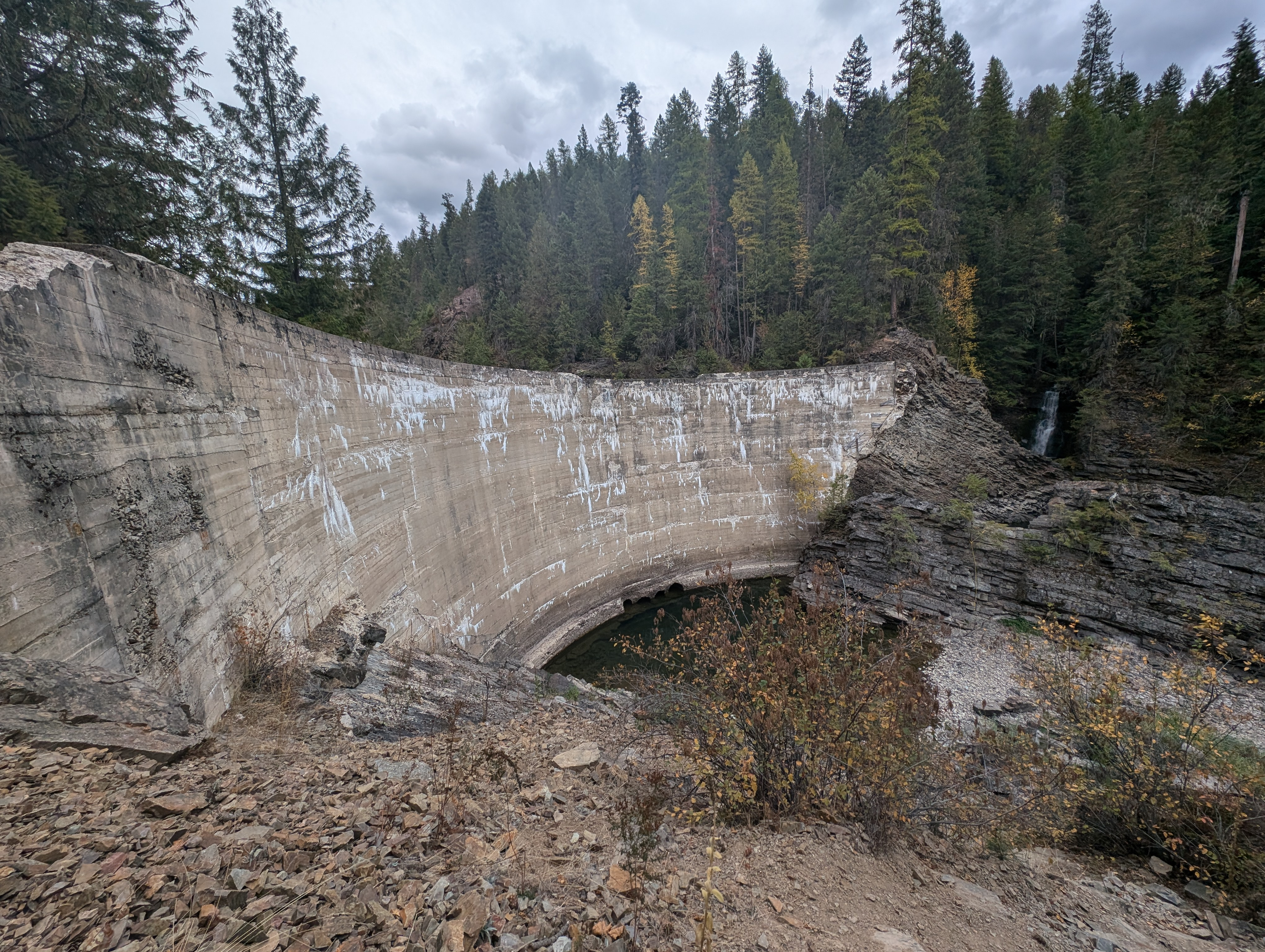
The remnants of the Old Eileen Dam

The ruins of the 1923 version of the dam, the Old Eileen Dam 48.77550°N 116.15514°W, stands five miles upstream. It's noted as one of the few concrete single-angle thin-arch dams to be breached, although it was not a structural failure. A sudden flood in 1925 overtopped the 52-foot (16 m) dam, washed out the left embankment, and left the dam shell intact. There were no casualties. The shell and rusting powerhouse equipment remain, posing an obstacle, and mystery, for white-water rafters.
