= Moyie Falls =

American waterfall

- Interactive map of Moyie Falls
- Location: Boundary County, Idaho
- Coordinates: 48°53′49″N 116°10′32″W
- Elevation: 1,936 feet (590 m)
- Total height: 85 feet (26 m)
- Watercourse: Moyie River

Moyie Falls el. 1,936 feet (590 m), Boundary County, Idaho, is an 85 foot (26 m) waterfall on the Moyie River Crashing through a rocky canyon, the Moyie River descends in tiered form. While the upper portion plummets 60 to 100 feet under an obsolete bridge connecting the gorge, the lower portion tumbles 20 to 40 feet.

== See also ==
- List of waterfalls
- List of waterfalls in Idaho
