= Russell and Pearl Soderling House =

Historic house in Idaho, United States

- U.S. National Register of Historic Places
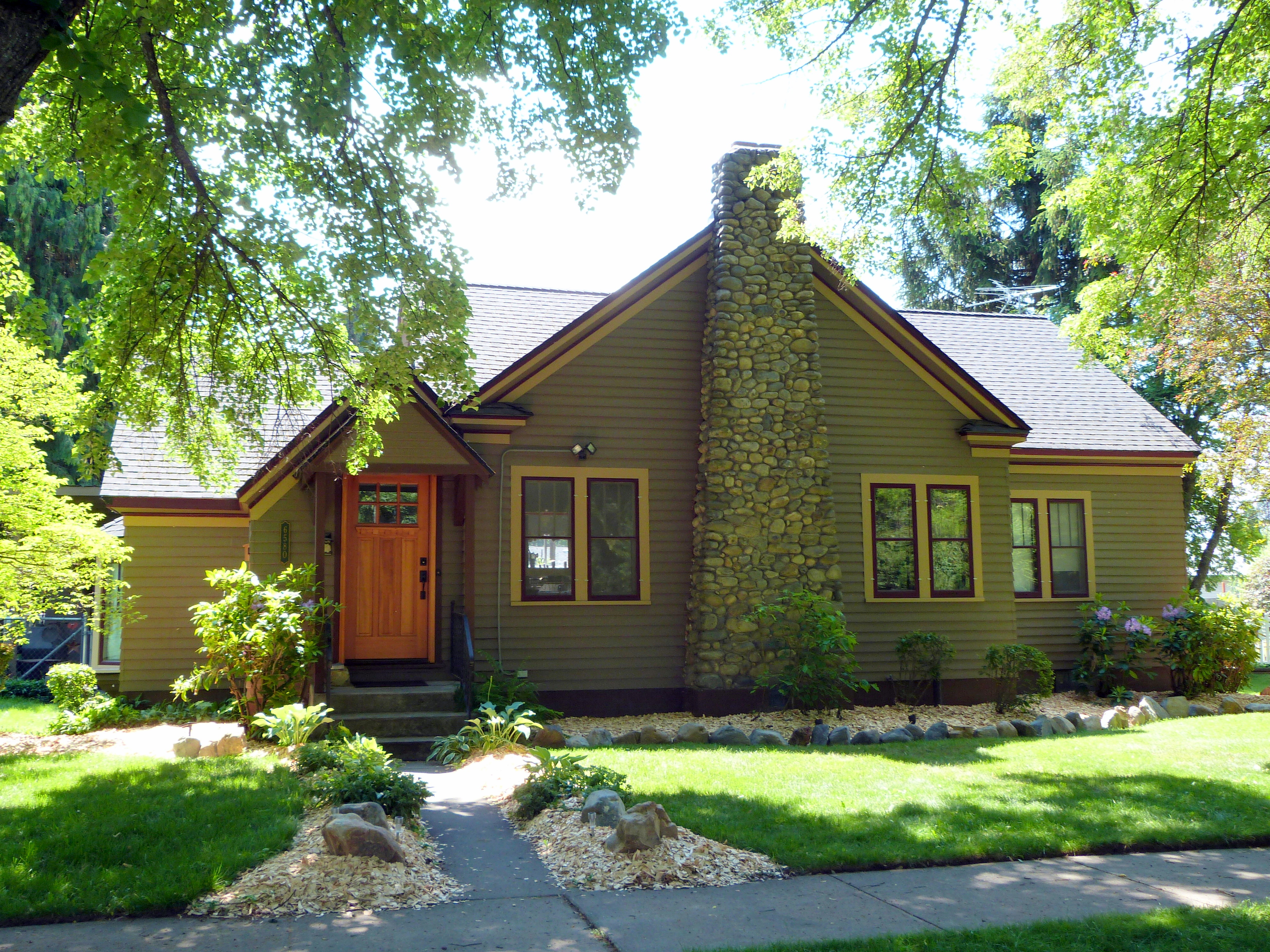

- Location within Idaho Location within the United States
- Location: 217 W. Madison St., Bonners Ferry, Idaho
- Coordinates: 48.691166°N 116.319133°W
- Area: less than one acre
- Built: 1938; 88 years ago
- Built by: Solderling, Russell
- Architectural style: Minimal-Traditional
- NRHP reference No.: 97001650
- Added to NRHP: January 15, 1998

The Russell and Pearl Soderling House, in Bonners Ferry in Boundary County, Idaho, was built in 1938. It was listed on the National Register of Historic Places in 1998.

It is a one-story frame house on a poured concrete foundation. Its NRHP nomination describes it as "an eclectic interpretation of the Minimal-Traditional style which gained great popularity during the 1930s."
