= Kootenai National Wildlife Refuge =

Wetlands and forest river valley sanctuary in the U.S. state of Idaho

- IUCN category IV (habitat/species management area)
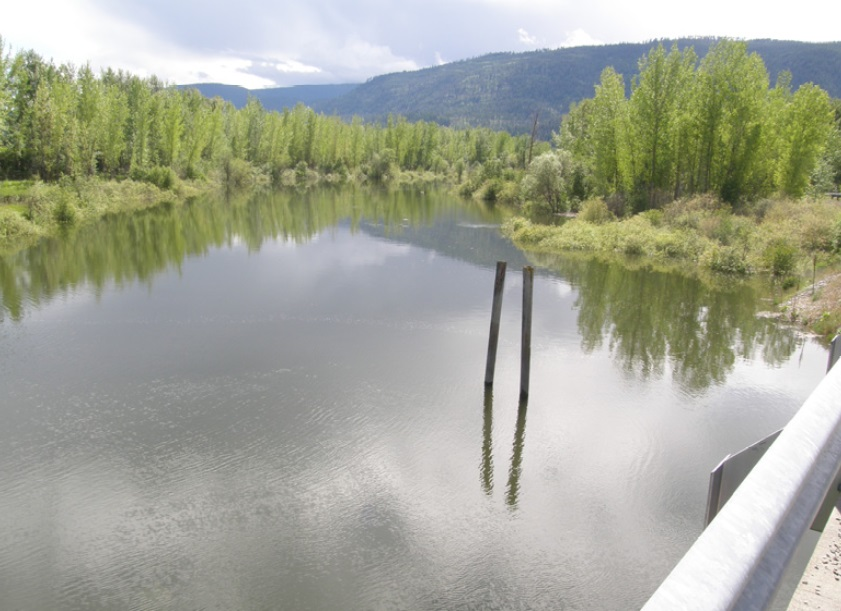

- Location within the United States
- Location: Boundary County, Idaho, United States
- Nearest city: Bonners Ferry, Idaho
- Coordinates: 48°42′30″N 116°24′34″W
- Area: 2,774 acres (11.23 km^{2})
- Established: 1964
- Governing body: U.S. Fish and Wildlife Service
- Website: Kootenai National Wildlife Refuge

The Kootenai National Wildlife Refuge is a National Wildlife Refuge of the United States located in northern Idaho. It is about 20 miles (32 km) from the Canada–United States border and 5 miles (8.0 km) from the town of Bonners Ferry. It is bordered by the Selkirk Mountains to the west, the Kootenai River to the east, and state lands to the south.

The refuge provides diverse habitat types, especially wetlands and hardwood and coniferous forest. It was established to preserve migration habitat for waterfowl, and more than 300 species of vertebrates inhabit the area, including coyote, Grizzly bear, elk, bald eagle, Great horned owl, cinnamon bear, moose, beaver, kestrel, river otter, red-tailed hawk, white-tailed deer, thirteen species of bats, northern harrier, and black bear.

The refuge has a surface area of 2,774 acres (11.23 km^{2}).
