= Fry's Trading Post =

- U.S. National Register of Historic Places
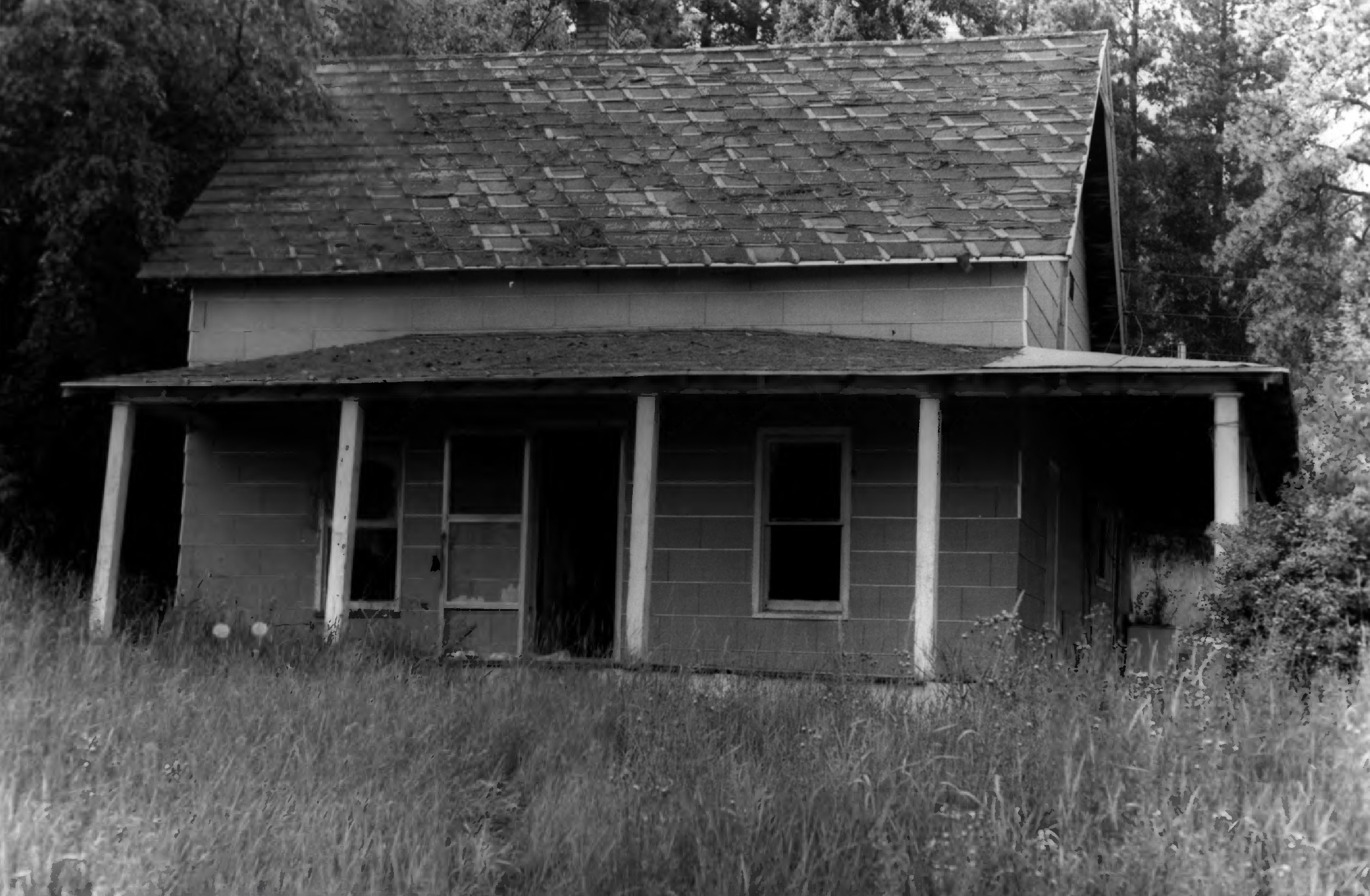

- Location within Idaho Location within the United States
- Location: Off US 95, Bonners Ferry, Idaho
- Coordinates: 48°42′0″N 116°18′59″W
- Area: less than one acre
- Built: 1876
- NRHP reference No.: 84001104
- Added to NRHP: September 7, 1984

Fry's Trading Post, near Bonners Ferry, Idaho, was built in 1876. It has also been known as Bonner-Fry Trading Post. It was listed on the National Register of Historic Places in 1983.

It was described in its NRHP nomination as a 1 1/2-story log building.

The facility was destroyed by fire.
