= Eastport–Kingsgate Border Crossing =

Border crossing between Canada and the United States

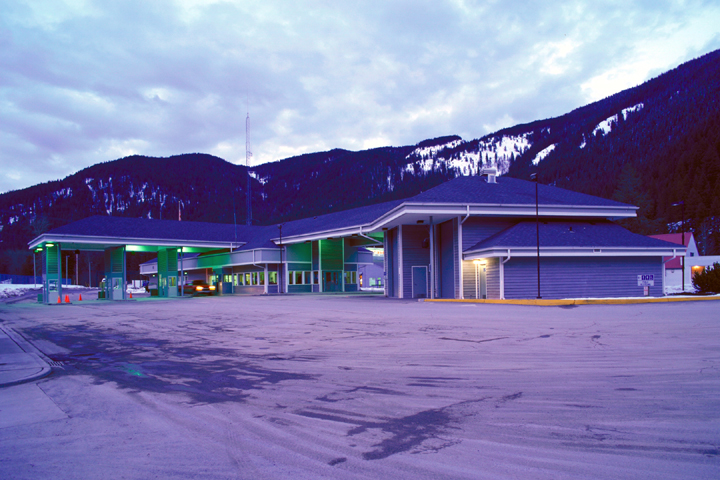
- US Border Inspection Station at Eastport, Idaho

Location
- Country: United States; Canada
- Location: US 95 / Highway 95; US Port: 537896 Hwy 95, Bonners Ferry, Idaho 83805; Canadian Port: 6917 Highway 95, Kingsgate, British Columbia V0B 1V1
- Coordinates: 49°00′02″N 116°10′53″W

Details
- Opened: 1906

Website
- US Canadian

The Eastport–Kingsgate Border Crossing connects the town of Bonners Ferry, Idaho with Yahk, British Columbia on the Canada–US border. U.S. Route 95 on the American side joins British Columbia Highway 95 on the Canadian side.

== Canadian side ==
From the junction with the Canadian Pacific Railway at Yahk, the rail head of the Spokane International Railroad (SI) reached the border in November 1905. Two months earlier, a Canadian customs office opened across the border at Eastport. In July 1906, an office opened at Kingsgate, under the administrative oversight of the Port of Nelson. In 1909, the Port of Cranbrook assumed oversight. In 1948, the status was upgraded to Port of Kingsgate. In 1961, 24-hour service began.

The depression-era wooden border station was replaced with a brick border station in 1953. This was replaced with the current concrete and steel structure in 2012.

This crossing is open 24 hours per day, 7 days per week.

== US side ==
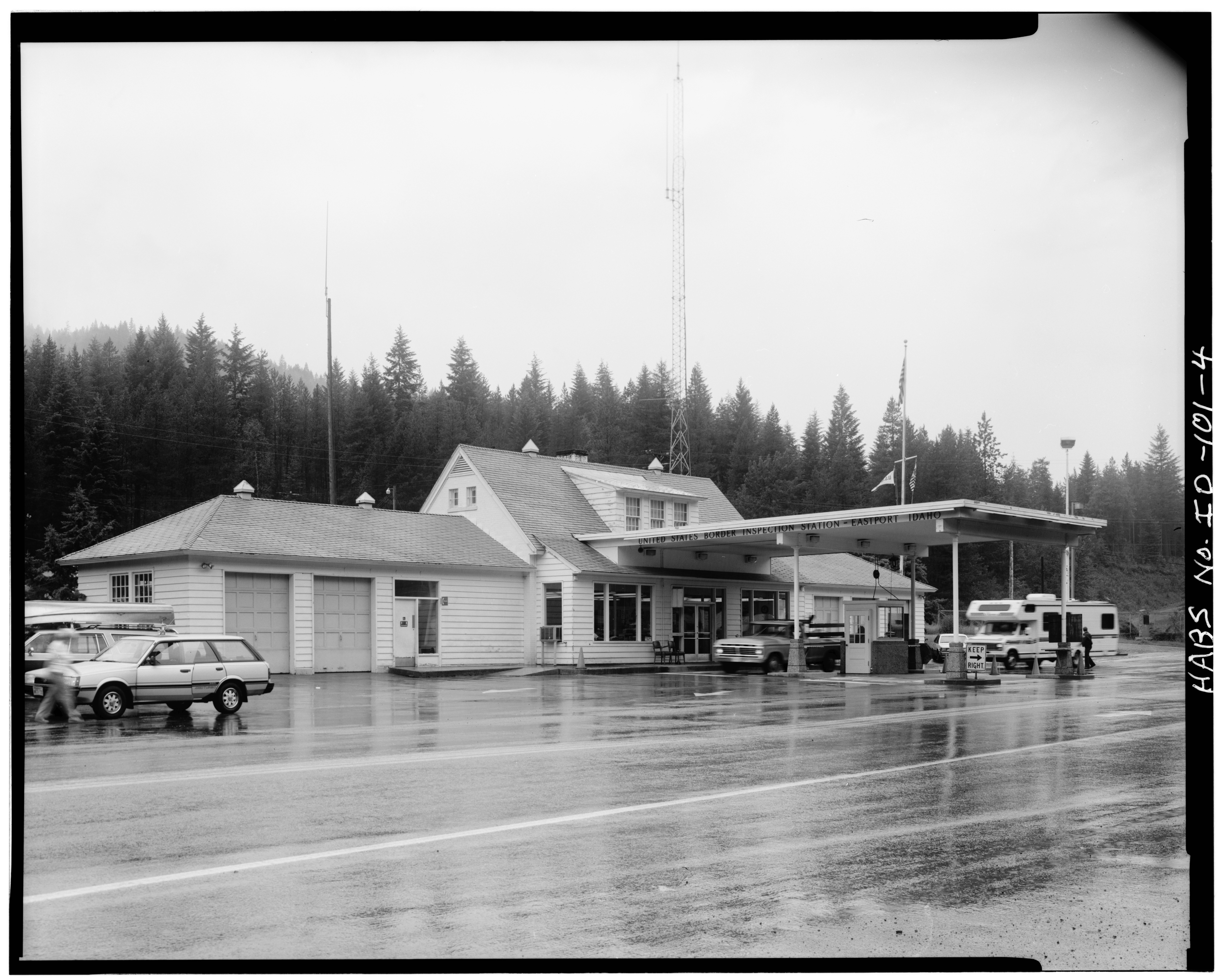
US Border Inspection Station at Eastport, ID, 1987

The SI rail head from the border reached Bonners Ferry in June 1906. The US Customs Service initially operated from space in the railroad depot. In 1934, land was purchased and a new facility was opened in 1936. The building underwent a series of upgrades over subsequent years. The border station was replaced by the current facility in 1988.

== See also ==
- List of Canada–United States border crossings
