= Good Grief, Idaho =

Unincorporated community in the state of Idaho, United States

Good Grief
- Unincorporated community
- Interactive map of Good Grief
- Location within Idaho Location within the United States
- Coordinates: 48°56′57″N 116°10′39″W
- Country: United States
- State: County

Good Grief is an unincorporated community in Boundary County, Idaho.

== History ==
Before the arrival of the European settlers, the site was part of ancestral lands of the Kutenai people.

The history of the community began in the mid 1950s, when two married people, Lou Paul Spring and Geraldine Spring, bought a preexisting small remote building in what is now Good Grief. Legend has it that when Geraldine learned of the purchase from Lou Paul, she exclaimed "Good Grief!", giving the community its name.

In the early 1970s, the television show Hee Haw mentioned the town of Good Grief as having "a population of three with two dogs and one old grouch".

By 1974, the community had started to increase in population, and in 1979, the singer Chuck Bianchi, who had recently moved to the area, recorded a song called "Good Grief Breakdown" about the town, which sold about 1,000 copies, most of them in the Canadian province of British Columbia.

Good Grief has not been included in past Census counts, so there is no exact population information as of 2025.

== Local attractions ==
Located four miles south of the Canadian border, the Good Grief Store is a restaurant operated in Good Grief. It was nonoperational between 1997 and 1999 and again from 2009 to 2019 before opening again later in 2019. Good Grief was the home of novelist and poet Denis Johnson.
