= North Side School =

- U.S. National Register of Historic Places
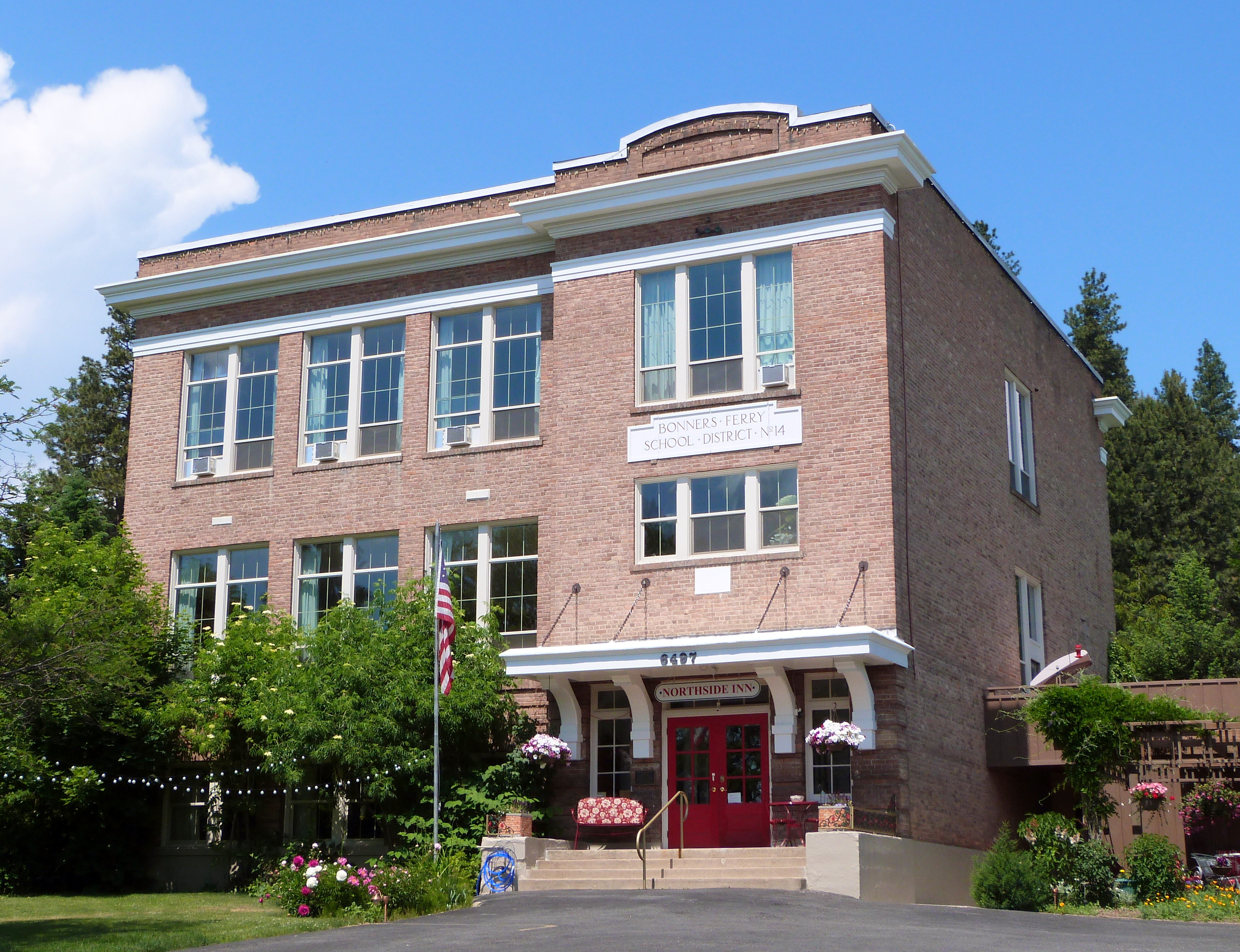

- Location within Idaho Location within the United States
- Location: 218 W. Commanche St., Bonners Ferry, Idaho
- Coordinates: 48°42′11″N 116°18′50″W
- Area: 1 acre (0.40 ha)
- Built: 1914
- Built by: Cox, J.G.
- Architect: Keith & Whitehouse
- Architectural style: Classical Revival
- MPS: Public School Buildings in Idaho MPS
- NRHP reference No.: 92000417
- Added to NRHP: May 5, 1992

The North Side School in Bonners Ferry, Idaho was built in 1914. It was listed on the National Register of Historic Places in 1992.

It was designed by Keith & Whitehouse and it was built by J.G. Cox. It replaced a two-room schoolhouse and was used as a school from 1914 until 1990. The building then was purchased by Jim and Ruth Burkholder who planned to renovate it to serve as their home.
