= Boundary County Courthouse =

- U.S. National Register of Historic Places
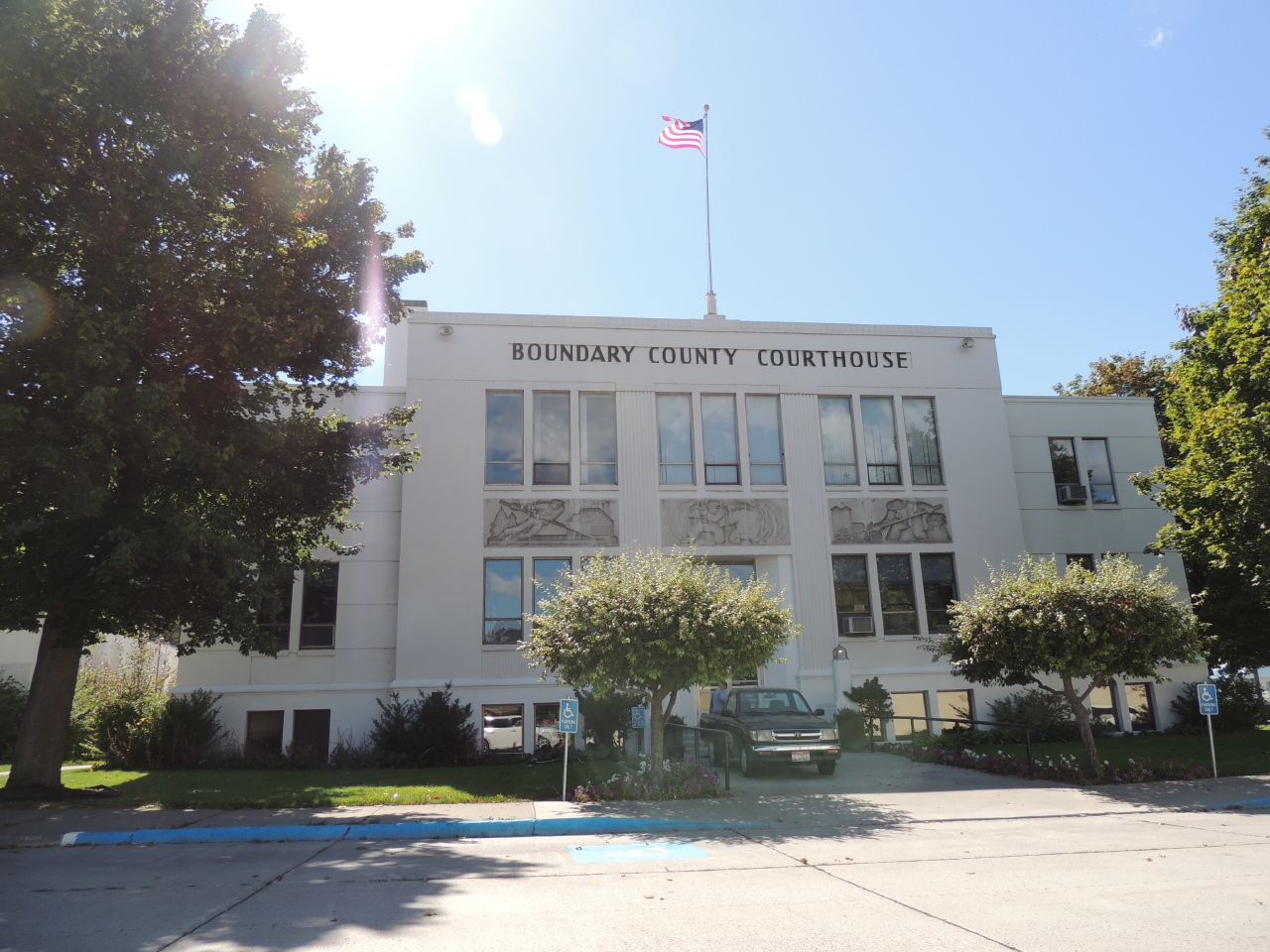

- Location within Idaho Location within the United States
- Location: Kootenai St., Bonners Ferry, Idaho
- Coordinates: 48°41′45″N 116°18′50″W
- Built: 1941
- Architect: Martin, Fletcher
- Architectural style: Art Deco
- NRHP reference No.: 87001581
- Added to NRHP: September 27, 1987

The Boundary County Courthouse (also known as 001316) is a courthouse building located in Bonners Ferry, Idaho. The courthouse is the center of government of Boundary County. The Works Progress Administration built the courthouse in 1941 at a cost of $100,000. The courthouse replaced Boundary County's first wooden courthouse, which had been a hotel and school before the county bought it in 1916. The new courthouse featured an Art Deco design which included three decorative panels depicting the agriculture, mining, and lumber industries, the three main components of the county's economy.

The courthouse was listed on the National Register of Historic Places on September 27, 1987.

== See also ==
- National Register of Historic Places listings in Boundary County, Idaho
