= Eastport, Idaho =

Unincorporated community in the state of Idaho, United States

- Unincorporated community
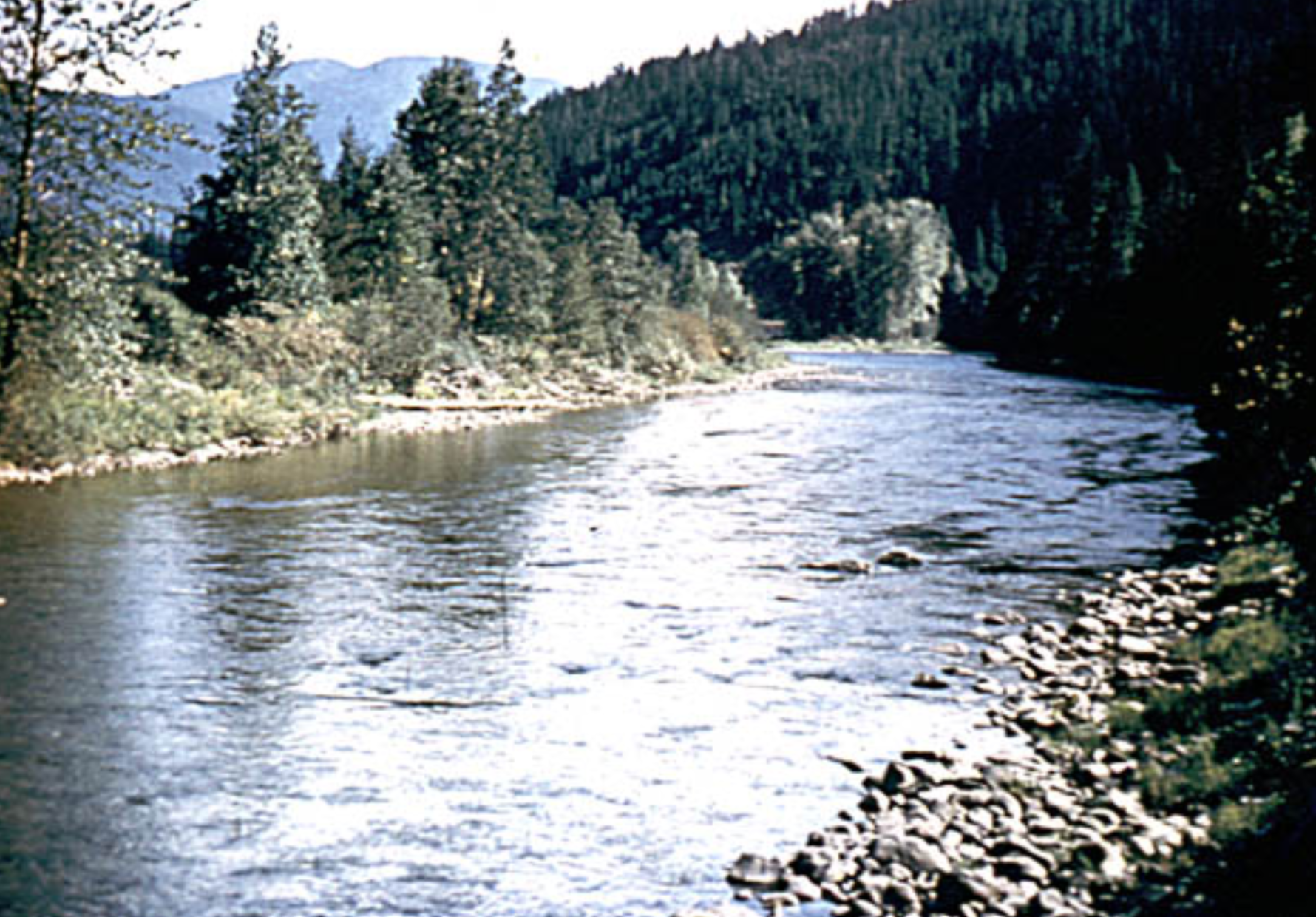
- Section of the Moyie River in Eastport

- Location within Idaho Location within the United States
- Coordinates: 48°59′58″N 116°10′53″W
- Country: United States
- State: Idaho
- County: Boundary
- Elevation: 2,628 ft (801 m)
- Time zone: UTC-8 (Pacific (PST))
  - Summer (DST): UTC-7 (PDT)
- ZIP code: 83826
- Area codes: 208, 986
- GNIS feature ID: 396438

Eastport is an unincorporated community in Boundary County, Idaho, United States. Eastport is located at the Canada–US border along U.S. Route 95, across from Kingsgate, British Columbia and 19 miles (31 km) north of Moyie Springs. It is connected to Canada by the Eastport-Kingsgate Border Crossing. Eastport has a post office with ZIP code 83826.

== History ==
Eastport's population was 50 in 1909, and was estimated at 100 in 1960.
