= Moyie Springs, Idaho =

- City
- Location of Moyie Springs in Boundary County, Idaho.
- Coordinates: 48°43′30″N 116°11′44″W
- Country: United States
- State: Idaho
- County: Boundary

Area
  - Total: 1.51 sq mi (3.91 km^{2})
  - Land: 1.51 sq mi (3.91 km^{2})
  - Water: 0 sq mi (0.00 km^{2})
- Elevation: 2,202 ft (671 m)

Population (2020)
  - Total: 822
  - Density: 544/sq mi (210/km^{2})
- Time zone: UTC-8 (Pacific (PST))
  - Summer (DST): UTC-7 (PDT)
- ZIP code: 83845
- Area codes: 208, 986
- FIPS code: 16-55270
- GNIS feature ID: 2411189

Moyie Springs is a city in Boundary County, Idaho, United States. The population was 822 at the 2020 census.

== Geography ==
According to the United States Census Bureau, the city has a total area of 1.52 square miles (3.94 km^{2}), all of it land.

Moyie Springs is located near the confluence of the Moyie and Kootenai rivers.

== Demographics ==
Historical population
Census	Pop.	Note	%±
1950	109		—
1960	196		79.8%
1970	203		3.6%
1980	386		90.1%
1990	415		7.5%
2000	656		58.1%
2010	718		9.5%
2020	822		14.5%
U.S. Decennial Census

=== 2010 census ===
At the 2020 census, there were 718 people, 270 households and 190 families residing in the city. The population density was 472.4 per square mile (182.4/km^{2}). There were 297 housing units at an average density of 195.4 per square mile (75.4/km^{2}). The racial make-up of the city was 93.6% White, 0.8% African American, 0.7% Native American, 0.1% Asian, 1.7% from other races, and 3.1% from two or more races. Hispanic or Latino of any race were 7.7% of the population.

There were 270 households, of which 41.5% had children under the age of 18 living with them, 51.1% were married couples living together, 11.1% had a female householder with no husband present, 8.1% had a male householder with no wife present, and 29.6% were non-families. 24.1% of all households were made up of individuals, and 8.9% had someone living alone who was 65 years of age or older. The average household size was 2.66 and the average family size was 3.12.

The median age was 32.3 years. 31.8% of residents were under the age of 18; 6.5% were between the ages of 18 and 24; 26.8% were from 25 to 44; 24.1% were from 45 to 64; and 10.6% were 65 years of age or older. The gender make-up was 48.6% male and 51.4% female.

=== 2000 census ===
At the 2000 census, there were 656 people, 240 households and 177 families residing in the city. The population density was 432.5 per square mile (167.0/km^{2}). There were 254 housing units at an average density of 167.5 per square mile (64.7/km^{2}). The racial make-up was 98.02% White, 0.76% Native American, 0.15% Asian, 0.61% from other races, and 0.46% from two or more races. Hispanic or Latino of any race were 2.44% of the population.

There were 240 households, of which 38.3% had children under the age of 18 living with them, 60.8% were married couples living together, 9.6% had a female householder with no husband present, and 26.3% were non-families. 18.3% of all households were made up of individuals, and 5.0% had someone living alone who was 65 years of age or older. The average household size was 2.73 and the average family size was 3.14.

32.8% of the population were under the age of 18, 6.9% from 18 to 24, 27.9% from 25 to 44, 20.7% from 45 to 64, and 11.7% who were 65 years of age or older. The median age was 32 years. For every 100 females, there were 88.0 males. For every 100 females age 18 and over, there were 90.9 males.

The median household income was $35,781 and the median family income was $36,042. Males had a median income of $32,788 and females $30,500. The per capita income was $15,516. About 13.6% of families and 17.6% of the population were below the poverty line, including 21.9% of those under age 18 and 6.1% of those age 65 or over.

== Politics ==
Presidential elections results

Previous presidential elections results
Year	Republican	Democratic	Third parties
2020	82.8% 342	14% 58	3.1% 13
2016	75.5% 245	15.1% 49	9.4% 30

Statewide elections results

Previous statewide elections results
Year	Republican	Democratic	Third parties
2020 Senate	80.5% 326	14.1% 57	5.4% 22
2018 Governor	75.1% 193	21.9% 57	3% 8
2018 Lt. Governor	78% 199	22% 56	0% 0
2018 Attorney General	78.3% 198	21.7% 55	0% 0
2016 Senate	80.1% 260	13.9% 45	6% 19

== Education ==
There is one school district in Boundary County: Boundary County School District 101.

Boundary County is in the catchment area, but not the taxation zone, for North Idaho College.

== See also ==
- List of cities in Idaho
