= Boundary County, Idaho =

County in Idaho, United States

- County
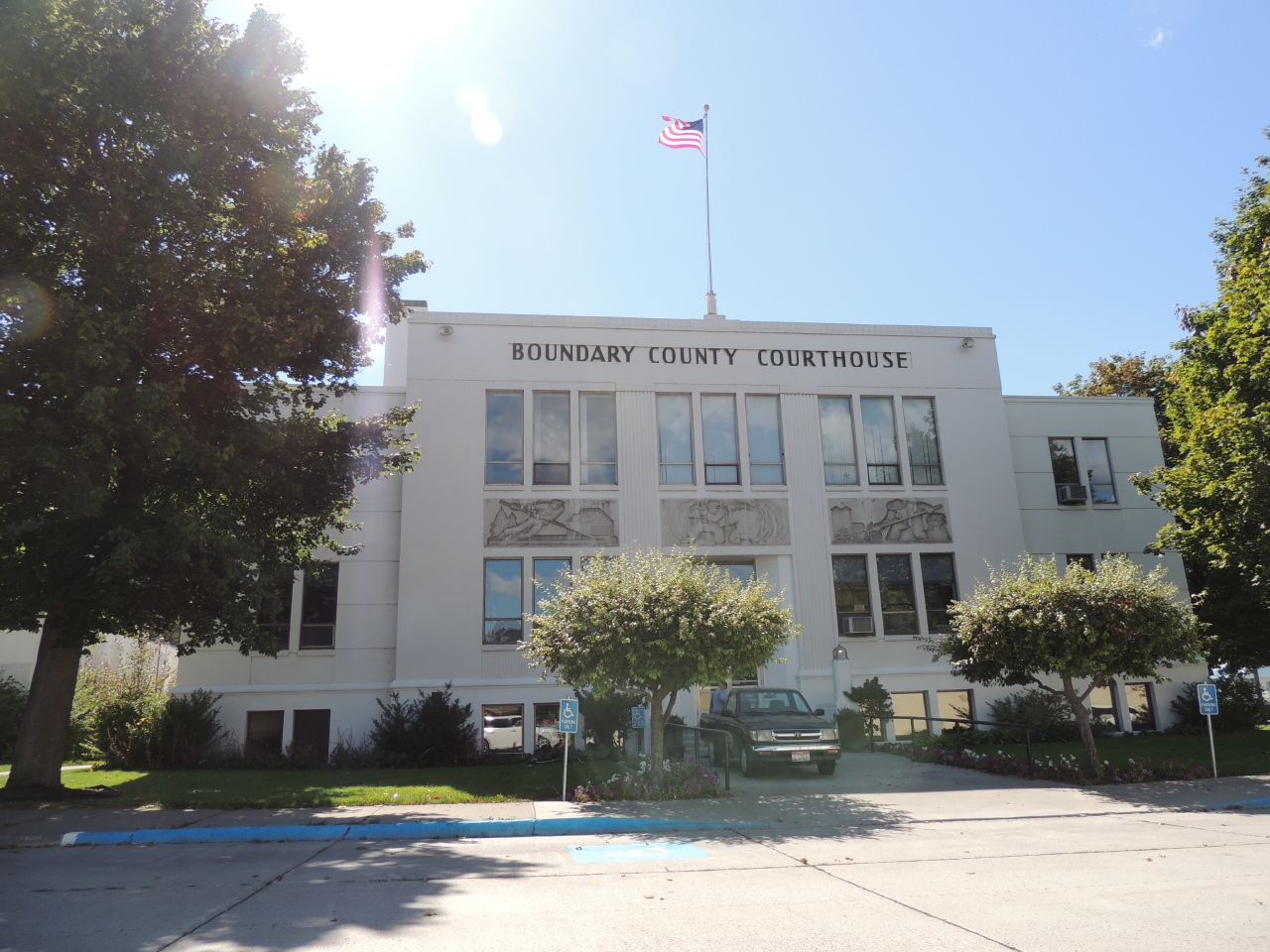
- Boundary County Courthouse

- Seal

- Location within the U.S. state of Idaho
- Coordinates: 48°47′N 116°27′W
- Country: United States
- State: Idaho
- Founded: January 23, 1915
- Named for: Canada–United States border
- Seat: Bonners Ferry
- Largest city: Bonners Ferry

Area
  - Total: 1,278 sq mi (3,310 km^{2})
  - Land: 1,269 sq mi (3,290 km^{2})
  - Water: 9.3 sq mi (24 km^{2}) 0.7%

Population (2020)
  - Total: 12,056
  - Estimate (2025): 13,997 ▲
  - Density: 9.500/sq mi (3.668/km^{2})
- Time zone: UTC−8 (Pacific)
  - Summer (DST): UTC−7 (PDT)
- Congressional district: 1st
- Website: boundarycountyid.org

Boundary County is the northernmost county of the U.S. state of Idaho. As of the 2020 census, the population was 12,056. The county seat and largest city is Bonners Ferry.

Boundary County was created by the Idaho Legislature on January 23, 1915. It is so named because it borders Canada, and is therefore the only county in Idaho with an international border. It is also only one of three counties in the United States that borders two states and a foreign country, the others being Coös County, New Hampshire, and (via a water rather than land border) Erie County, Pennsylvania; these three counties additionally make up the entirety of the international border of their respective states, the only three counties nationwide to do so.

== History ==
Boundary County was formed on January 23, 1915, from Bonner County. It was named Boundary County because it lies on the border of Canada, Washington and Montana.

Boundary County has seven election precincts: Bonners Ferry, Copeland, Kootenai, Moyie, Naples, North Bonners Ferry, and Valley View. All contain part of Bonners Ferry City except Copeland, Moyie, and Naples precincts. Moyie Springs was incorporated in 1947.

Settlement of the area started with the establishment of Bonners Ferry on the Kootenai River in 1864. Settlement was limited to the ferry operation until about 1890. The town of Bonners Ferry was established in 1893. At that point settlement was still sparse with small ranching and mining operations, but an expanding timber economy. By 1900, other areas started to develop with the Boulder (now Kootenai), Boundary (now Copeland), and Naples precincts first listed in the U.S. Census of that year. The Moyie precinct first appeared in the 1910 census.

In 1980, convicted spy Christopher John Boyce found refuge in Boundary County, for a few months, after his escape from the Lompoc Federal Correctional Complex. He stayed at the home of Gloria Ann White. Boyce sustained himself during his stay with a series of bank robberies in the surrounding area, allegedly with technical assistance from White.

In 1992, Boundary County was the scene of the Ruby Ridge siege by 350–400 armed federal agents against Randy Weaver and his family.

In April 2024, the city council of Bonners Ferry, the county seat of Boundary County, unanimously passed a resolution to continue flying the Canadian flag at its visitor center, despite state restrictions that threatened to remove all foreign flags from government properties. The resolution was seen as a symbolic gesture honoring the region's historic and economic ties with neighboring British Columbia, especially amid growing tensions over state-level efforts to restrict certain displays of international symbols on public grounds.

== Geography ==
According to the U.S. Census Bureau, the county has a total area of 1,278 square miles (3,310 km^{2}), of which 1,269 square miles (3,290 km^{2}) is land and 9.3 square miles (24 km^{2}) (0.7%) is water.

=== Adjacent counties ===
- Lincoln County, Montana – east/Mountain Time Border
- Bonner County – south
- Pend Oreille County, Washington – west
- Regional District of Central Kootenay, British Columbia – north

=== National protected areas ===
- Pacific Northwest National Scenic Trail (part)
- Kaniksu National Forest (part)
- Kootenai National Forest (part)
- Kootenai National Wildlife Refuge

== Transportation ==
=== Highways ===
- US 2
- US 95
- SH-1

=== Airports ===
Boundary County Airport is a county-owned, public-use airport located two nautical miles (3.7 km) northeast of the central business district of Bonners Ferry.

== Demographics ==
Historical population
Census	Pop.	Note	%±
1920	4,474		—
1930	4,555		1.8%
1940	5,987		31.4%
1950	5,908		−1.3%
1960	5,809		−1.7%
1970	6,371		9.7%
1980	7,289		14.4%
1990	8,332		14.3%
2000	9,871		18.5%
2010	10,972		11.2%
2020	12,056		9.9%
2025 (est.)	13,997	▲	16.1%
U.S. Decennial Census; 1790–1960 1900–1990; 1990–2000 2010–2020 2020

=== Racial and ethnic composition ===
Boundary County, Idaho – Racial and ethnic composition Note: the US Census treats Hispanic/Latino as an ethnic category. This table excludes Latinos from the racial categories and assigns them to a separate category. Hispanics/Latinos may be of any race.
Race / Ethnicity (NH = Non-Hispanic)	Pop 1980	Pop 1990	Pop 2000	Pop 2010	Pop 2020	% 1980	% 1990	% 2000	% 2010	% 2020
White alone (NH)	7,083	7,847	9,198	10,110	10,550	97.17%	94.18%	93.18%	92.14%	87.51%
Black or African American alone (NH)	3	3	9	29	27	0.04%	0.04%	0.09%	0.26%	0.22%
Native American or Alaska Native alone (NH)	90	147	184	167	145	1.23%	1.76%	1.86%	1.52%	1.20%
Asian alone (NH)	29	23	56	56	72	0.40%	0.28%	0.57%	0.51%	0.60%
Native Hawaiian or Pacific Islander alone (NH)	x	x	7	6	9	x	x	0.07%	0.05%	0.07%
Other race alone (NH)	1	2	4	6	71	0.01%	0.02%	0.04%	0.05%	0.59%
Mixed race or Multiracial (NH)	x	x	78	196	490	x	x	0.79%	1.79%	4.06%
Hispanic or Latino (any race)	83	310	335	402	692	1.14%	3.72%	3.39%	3.66%	5.74%
Total	7,289	8,332	9,871	10,972	12,056	100.00%	100.00%	100.00%	100.00%	100.00%

=== 2020 census ===
As of the 2020 census, the county had a population of 12,056. The median age was 46.9 years, 23.3% of residents were under the age of 18, and 25.9% were 65 years of age or older. For every 100 females there were 103.2 males, and for every 100 females age 18 and over there were 101.5 males age 18 and over.

The racial makeup of the county was 88.9% White, 0.2% Black or African American, 1.4% American Indian and Alaska Native, 0.6% Asian, 0.1% Native Hawaiian and Pacific Islander, 2.5% from some other race, and 6.3% from two or more races. Hispanic or Latino residents of any race comprised 5.7% of the population.

0.0% of residents lived in urban areas, while 100.0% lived in rural areas.

There were 4,763 households in the county, of which 27.1% had children under the age of 18 living with them and 19.0% had a female householder with no spouse or partner present. About 26.2% of all households were made up of individuals and 14.4% had someone living alone who was 65 years of age or older.

There were 5,400 housing units, of which 11.8% were vacant. Among occupied housing units, 77.7% were owner-occupied and 22.3% were renter-occupied. The homeowner vacancy rate was 1.8% and the rental vacancy rate was 6.4%.

=== 2010 census ===
As of the 2010 United States census, there were 10,972 people, 4,421 households, and 2,976 families living in the county. The population density was 8.6 inhabitants per square mile (3.3/km^{2}). There were 5,175 housing units at an average density of 4.1 units per square mile (1.6 units/km^{2}). The racial makeup of the county was 94.8% white, 1.7% American Indian, 0.6% Asian, 0.3% black or African American, 0.1% Pacific islander, 0.5% from other races, and 2.1% from two or more races. Those of Hispanic or Latino origin made up 3.7% of the population. In terms of ancestry, 22.5% were German, 12.8% were English, 11.2% were Irish, 7.4% were American, 5.9% were Norwegian, 5.4% were Dutch, and 5.1% were Scottish.

Of the 4,421 households, 29.7% had children under the age of 18 living with them, 55.0% were married couples living together, 7.6% had a female householder with no husband present, 32.7% were non-families, and 27.5% of all households were made up of individuals. The average household size was 2.47 and the average family size was 3.00. The median age was 42.8 years.

The median income for a household in the county was $37,712 and the median income for a family was $43,562. Males had a median income of $36,125 versus $26,076 for females. The per capita income for the county was $18,011. About 15.7% of families and 18.8% of the population were below the poverty line, including 22.0% of those under age 18 and 13.4% of those age 65 or over.

=== 2000 census ===
As of the census of 2000, there were 9,871 people, 3,707 households, and 2,698 families living in the county. The population density was 8 people per square mile (3.1 people/km^{2}). There were 4,095 housing units at an average density of 3 units per square mile (1.2 units/km^{2}). The racial makeup of the county was 95.24% White, 0.16% Black or African American, 2.02% Native American, 0.58% Asian, 0.07% Pacific Islander, 0.86% from other races, and 1.07% from two or more races. 3.39% of the population were Hispanic or Latino of any race. 21.4% were of German, 12.9% American, 12.7% English, 9.9% Irish and 6.4% Norwegian ancestry.

There were 3,707 households, out of which 34.10% had children under the age of 18 living with them, 61.40% were married couples living together, 7.50% had a female householder with no husband present, and 27.20% were non-families. 23.10% of all households were made up of individuals, and 8.50% had someone living alone who was 65 years of age or older. The average household size was 2.61 and the average family size was 3.07.

In the county, the population was spread out, with 29.20% under the age of 18, 6.90% from 18 to 24, 24.40% from 25 to 44, 26.20% from 45 to 64, and 13.40% who were 65 years of age or older. The median age was 38 years. For every 100 females there were 101.40 males. For every 100 females age 18 and over, there were 100.60 males.

The median income for a household in the county was $31,250, and the median income for a family was $36,440. Males had a median income of $31,209 versus $18,682 for females. The per capita income for the county was $14,636. About 11.50% of families and 20% of the population were below the poverty line, including 19.50% of those under age 18 and 11.40% of those age 65 or over.

== Politics ==
Like most of Idaho, Boundary County is solidly Republican. The last Democratic presidential candidate to carry the county was Lyndon B. Johnson in 1964. Boundary County is part of Idaho Legislative District 1. As of 2024, it is represented in the Idaho Legislature by Senator Jim Woodward and Representatives Mark Sauter and Cornel Rasor.

United States presidential election results for Boundary County, Idaho
Year	Republican		Democratic		Third party(ies)	
Year	No.	%	No.	%	No.	%
1916	598	44.07%	653	48.12%	106	7.81%
1920	883	62.71%	525	37.29%	0	0.00%
1924	829	46.97%	244	13.82%	692	39.21%
1928	1,015	61.66%	607	36.88%	24	1.46%
1932	763	33.35%	1,451	63.42%	74	3.23%
1936	732	33.86%	1,304	60.31%	126	5.83%
1940	1,221	45.49%	1,393	51.90%	70	2.61%
1944	1,064	49.26%	1,053	48.75%	43	1.99%
1948	910	43.35%	1,029	49.02%	160	7.62%
1952	1,641	60.98%	1,040	38.65%	10	0.37%
1956	1,419	55.24%	1,150	44.76%	0	0.00%
1960	1,237	45.18%	1,501	54.82%	0	0.00%
1964	1,065	42.89%	1,418	57.11%	0	0.00%
1968	1,084	47.19%	883	38.44%	330	14.37%
1972	1,587	59.26%	860	32.11%	231	8.63%
1976	1,458	52.15%	1,217	43.53%	121	4.33%
1980	2,088	59.44%	1,087	30.94%	338	9.62%
1984	2,159	63.46%	1,158	34.04%	85	2.50%
1988	1,800	56.21%	1,336	41.72%	66	2.06%
1992	1,479	39.19%	1,095	29.01%	1,200	31.80%
1996	1,937	50.05%	1,194	30.85%	739	19.10%
2000	2,797	72.01%	832	21.42%	255	6.57%
2004	3,012	68.78%	1,268	28.96%	99	2.26%
2008	3,078	65.02%	1,484	31.35%	172	3.63%
2012	3,138	69.06%	1,225	26.96%	181	3.98%
2016	3,789	73.39%	933	18.07%	441	8.54%
2020	4,937	78.15%	1,220	19.31%	160	2.53%
2024	5,794	81.49%	1,145	16.10%	171	2.41%

== Media ==
=== Television ===
A local translator district provides broadcast television stations from Spokane, WA.

=== Radio ===
KBFI, 1450 AM - Bonners Ferry has been home to KBFI AM 1450 since 1983. It is owned by local licensee Radio Bonners Ferry, Inc, owned by Blue Sky Broadcasting, Inc. While licensed to Bonner's Ferry and its transmitter site is there, KBFI shares studios and offices with its sister stations (KSPT, KIBR, and KPND), at 327 Marion Avenue in Sandpoint, Idaho.

KSBF, 88.9 FM - Owned and operated by Bonners Ferry Baptist Church, KSBF began broadcasting in 2024, and is an affiliate of the Fundamental Broadcasting Network.

KQFR, 90.7 FM - On September 7, 2022, KQFR, 90.7 FM began broadcasting. Affiliated with "Cornerstone Christian School," KQFR airs a Christian format and is licensed to Moyie Springs.

=== Newspapers ===
Bonners Ferry is served by a single newspaper and several online news outlets. The weekly Bonners Ferry Herald, owned by Hagadone Publishing is the official paper of record.

== Communities ==
=== Cities ===
- Bonners Ferry
- Moyie Springs

=== Unincorporated communities ===
- Copeland
- Eastport
- Good Grief
- Naples
- Porthill
- Curley Creek

== Education ==
There is one school district in Boundary County: Boundary County School District 101.

It is in the catchment area, but not the taxation zone, for North Idaho College.

== See also ==
- National Register of Historic Places listings in Boundary County, Idaho
