= U.S. Route 95 =

Highway in the United States

U.S. Route 95
- US 95 highlighted in red

Route information
- Length: 1,561 mi (2,512 km)
- Existed: November 11, 1926–present

Major junctions
- South end: Calle 1 to Fed. 2 at the Mexican border in San Luis, AZ
- I-8 in Yuma, AZ; I-10 from Quartzsite, AZ to Blythe, CA; I-40 in Needles, CA; I-11 / US 93 in Boulder City, NV; I-215 in Henderson, NV; I-15 / US 93 in Las Vegas, NV; I-80 in Winnemucca, NV; I-84 south of Fruitland, ID; I-90 in Coeur d'Alene, ID
- North end: Highway 95 at the Canadian border in Eastport, ID

Location
- Country: United States
- States: Arizona, California, Nevada, Oregon, Idaho

Highway system
- United States Numbered Highway System; List; Special; Divided
← US 94	→ US 96

U.S. Route 95 (US 95) is a major north–south United States Numbered Highway in the western United States. It travels through the states of Arizona, California, Nevada, Oregon, and Idaho, staying inland from the Pacific Coast. US 95 begins in San Luis, Arizona, at the Mexican border, where Calle 1—a short spur—leads to Highway 2 in San Luis Río Colorado, Sonora. Its northern terminus is at the Canadian border in Eastport, Idaho, where the roadway continues north as British Columbia Highway 95.

Unlike many other US Highways, it has not seen deletion or replacement on most of its length by an encroaching Interstate Highway corridor, due to its mostly rural and mountainous course. Because of this, it still travels from border to border and is a primary north–south highway in both Nevada and Idaho. This is one of the few US Routes to cross from Mexico to Canada.

== Route description ==
=== Arizona ===
US 95 begins in the United States at the San Luis Port of Entry, which connects it with Mexico. It then follows the Colorado River northward to San Luis and on to Yuma, where it goes through town and crosses I-8. As it leaves Yuma, US 95 is an undivided two-lane highway that passes through the U.S. Army's Yuma Proving Ground.

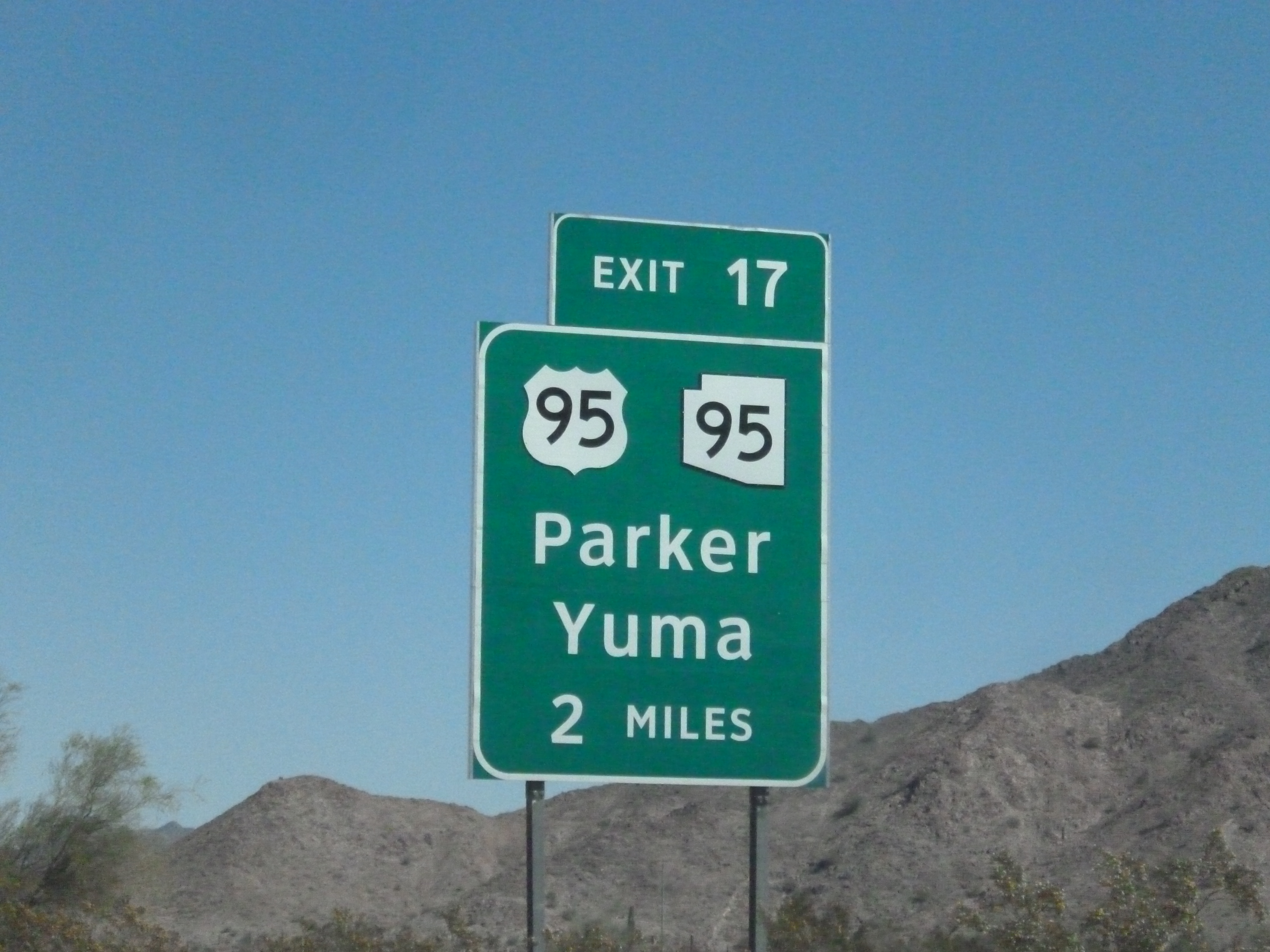
Sign for a US 95 junction along Interstate 10

It then travels northward between the proving ground to the west and the Kofa National Wildlife Refuge to the east until Quartzsite. Here, it merges with I-10 and runs concurrent with it. Together, they head westward for 17 miles (27 km) until the Colorado River, where it enters California, just shy of Blythe.

US 95 spends 123.16 miles (198.21 km) in Arizona.

=== California ===
US 95 enters California at Blythe along its concurrency with I-10. US 95 travels largely parallel to the west bank of the Colorado River until it joins I-40 in Needles. The route then travels north from Goffs to the Nevada state line.

The total distance in California is about 130 miles (210 km).

=== Nevada ===
US 95 in Nevada is a divided highway between Palm Gardens (the SR 163 junction to Laughlin) and Boulder City. It is the longest highway in Nevada, at nearly 647 miles (1,040 km). It joins the I-11–US 93 concurrency at an interchange southwest of Boulder City. (The original alignment cotinues as SR 173.) In Henderson, the three highways meet I-215 and Lake Mead Parkway (SR 564) at the Henderson Spaghetti Bowl. In Las Vegas, they cross I-15 at the Spaghetti Bowl, where US 93 becomes concurrent with I-15. US 95 continues as a freeway until again becoming a divided highway at Corn Creek Road, northwest of the Las Vegas Valley. Interstate 11 itself temporarily ends at an interchange with Kyle Canyon Road (SR 157).

Shortly after entering Nye County, US 95 becomes an undivided two-lane highway past the Mercury interchange, as it meanders northwestward through the state, roughly paralleling the California state line. Along this route, it runs through the Amargosa Valley, serving Beatty before heading north into Goldfield and Tonopah. The highway is concurrent with US 6 for several miles north of Tonopah, before it then heads north towards Hawthorne, Schurz (where it meets US 95 ALT, which heads northwest toward Yerington, Carson City—via US 50 west—Reno—via Ramsey Weeks Cutoff, US 50 east, SR 439 north, and I-80 west—via Fernley) and Fallon. North of Fallon, it meets and runs concurrently with I-80 for 93 miles (150 km), from Exit 83 west of Lovelock to Exit 176 at Winnemucca. It then heads north to the border with Oregon at McDermitt, a distance of 73 miles (120 km).

=== Oregon ===
In Oregon, US 95 is an undivided two-lane highway in the sparsely populated high desert in the southeastern corner of the state, running completely in rural Malheur County. From the Nevada state line at McDermitt, the highway heads north and gradually climbs to its crest at Blue Mountain Pass, at an elevation of 5,293 feet (1,613 m) above sea level. US 95 descends to Basque Station and Burns Junction at 3,960 feet (1,210 m), then eastward down to Rome (3,390 ft [1,030 m]) and up to Jordan Valley (4,389 ft [1,338 m]). The highway heads north–northeastward to the Idaho state line, entering southwest of Marsing in Owyhee County. The speed limit on US 95 in Oregon was 55 miles per hour (89 kilometers per hour) until March 2016, when it was raised to 70 miles per hour (110 km/h) to match the speed limits set by Nevada and Idaho.

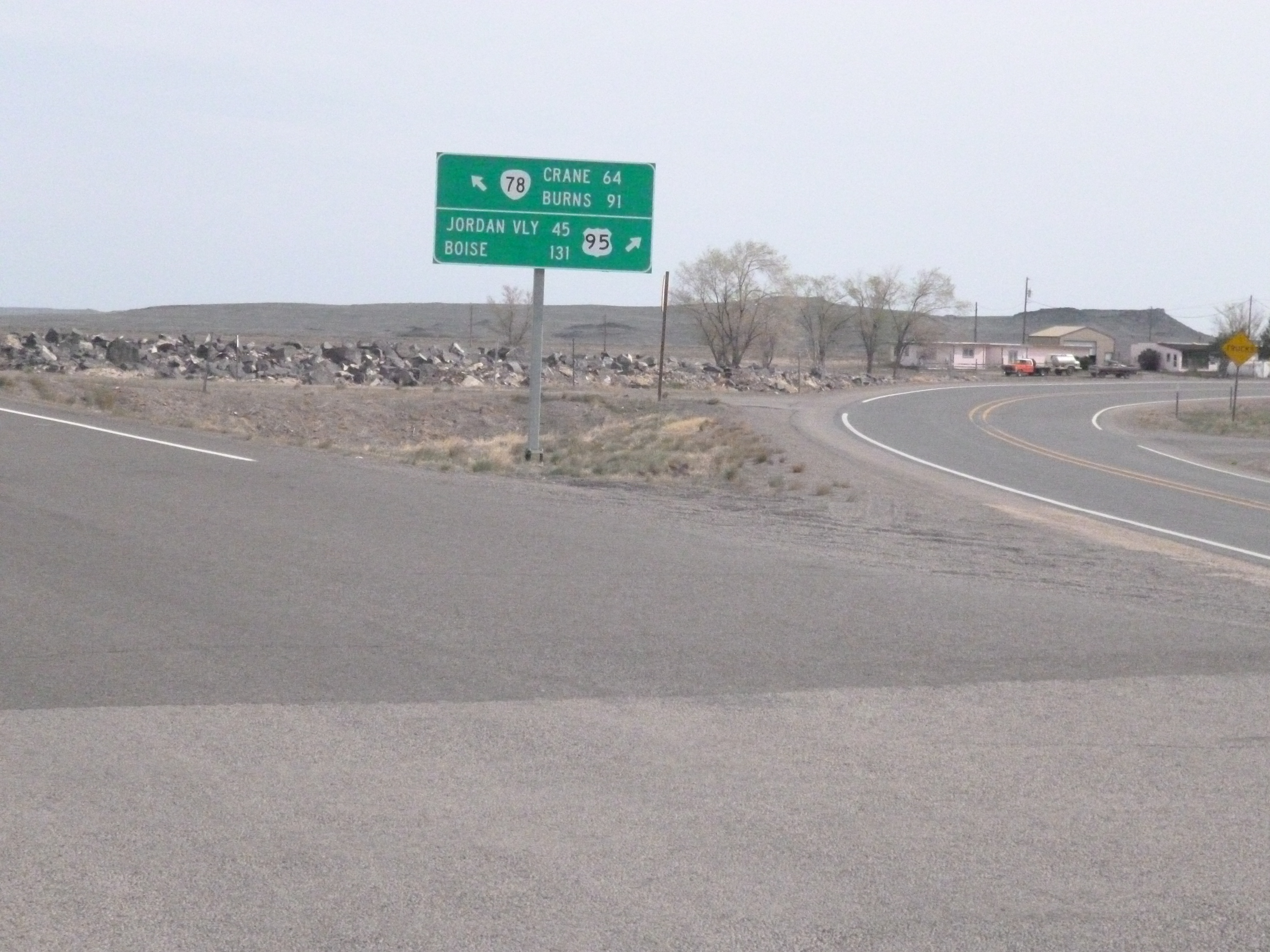
Intersection of US 95 and Oregon Route 78

US 95 is designated the I.O.N. Highway No. 456 (see Oregon highways and routes); "I.O.N." stands for "Idaho–Oregon–Nevada". This section of highway is a primary commercial route between Boise and northern California, connecting to I-80 at Winnemucca, Nevada. US 95 crosses into the Mountain Time Zone approximately 35 miles (56 km) north of Nevada.

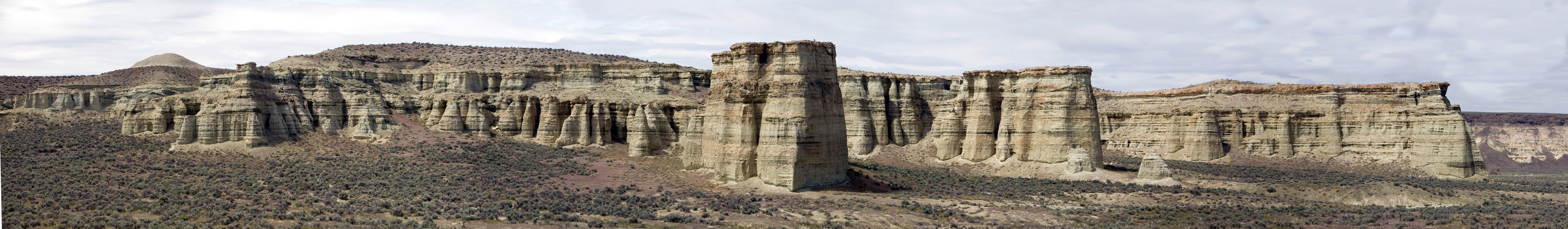
Pillars of Rome in southeastern Oregon, near Rome

=== Idaho ===
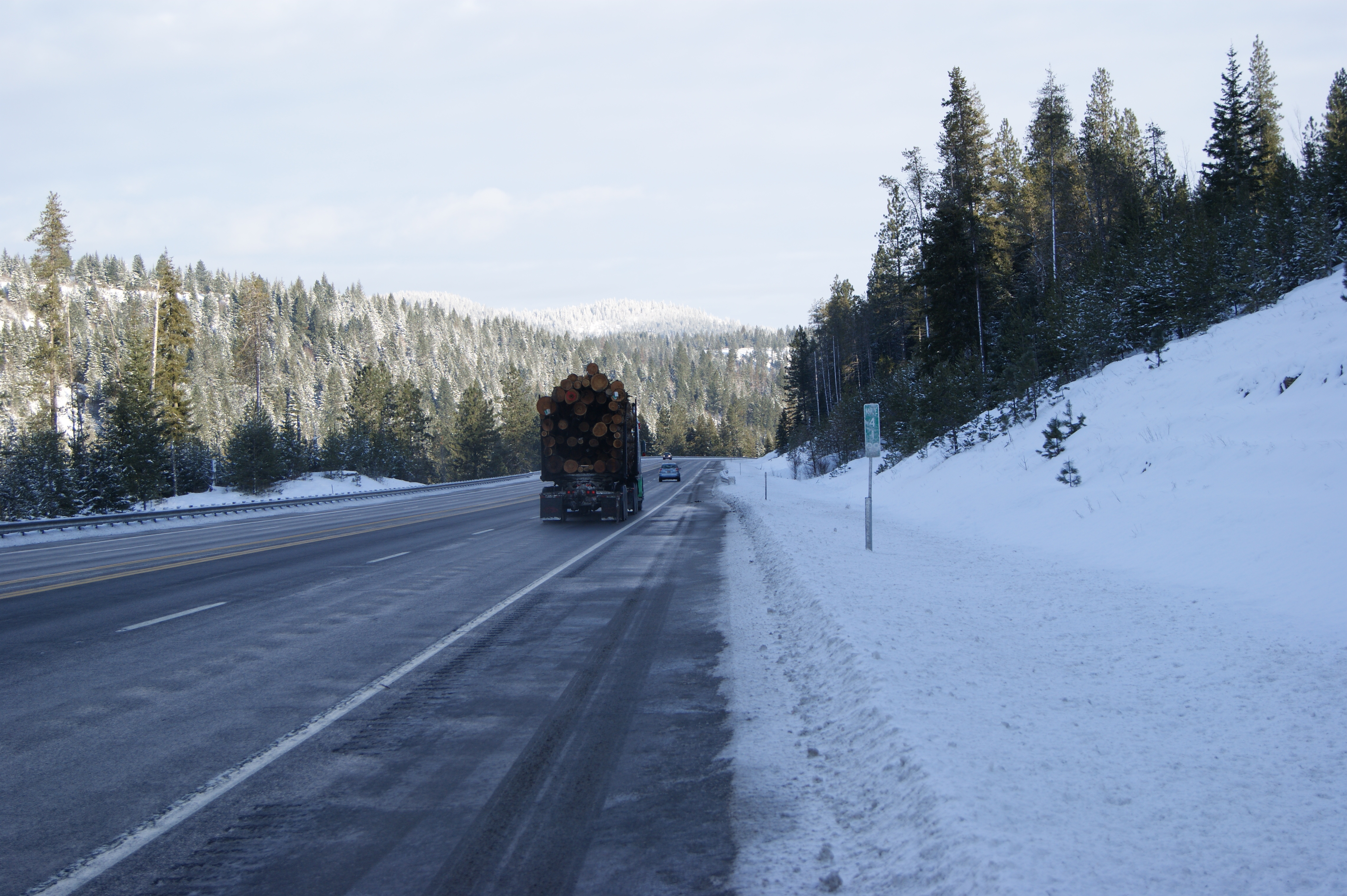
US 95 at mile marker 419.9 in Idaho

US 95 is an undivided two-lane highway during most of its length in Idaho, which is over 538 miles (866 km).

US 95 enters Idaho from Oregon in Owyhee County, about 50 miles (80 km) southwest of Boise. It passes through Homedale and crosses the Snake River before a junction with concurrent US 20 and US 26, which run together for eight miles (13 km). As it proceeds north, US 95 crosses I-84 and US 30 before going through the Payette National Forest. Immediately after Riggins, the highway re-enters the Pacific Time Zone as it crosses the Salmon River. US 95 follows the descending river, then climbs over White Bird Hill to the Camas Prairie, then descends the Lapwai Canyon to the Clearwater River. In August 2015, milepost 420 was replaced with one reading 419.9 to prevent the sign from being stolen by marijuana enthusiasts.

US 95 becomes a four-lane divided highway after crossing the river east of Lewiston; it runs concurrent with US 12 for several miles. The highways split as US 12 continues west to Lewiston and US 95 turns northwest and climbs a steep grade up to the rolling Palouse. At a junction with US 195, US 95 proceeds north to Moscow as a recently completed divided highway. It becomes an undivided highway in Moscow and continues north to Coeur d'Alene, crossing I-90. US 95 goes north to Sandpoint, where it joins with US 2, after which the highways run concurrent until after Bonners Ferry, where US 2 heads east to Montana and US 95 continues north to Canada, meeting British Columbia Highway 95 (BC 95) at the Canadian border at the Eastport–Kingsgate Border Crossing.

== History ==
US 95 was one of the original U.S. highways proposed in the 1925 Bureau of Public Roads numbering plan. Under the original proposal, the highway would only exist in Idaho from Payette to the Canada–US border north of Eastport. When the plan was adopted by the American Association of State Highway Transportation Officials on November 11, 1926, the route of US 95 had been approved south to Weiser, still existing solely in Idaho. A proposal to extend US 95 south to Winnemucca, Nevada was considered by AASHO in 1937; however, action was deferred due to sections in Oregon that were incomplete. AASHTO reconsidered the idea at its meeting on June 28, 1939, as part of a larger plan to extend the highway south to Blythe, California. This plan was adopted at that meeting and became effective on January 1, 1940. On June 27, 1960, US 95 was extended further south into Arizona through Yuma to the Mexican border in San Luis which still serves as the southern terminus of US 95.

=== Washington (former) ===
North of Lewiston, Idaho, US 95 entered Washington for 0.91 miles (1.46 km), partially concurrent with U.S. Route 195. The route was moved to a new four-lane divided highway that bypassed Washington in October 1977. The section was replaced by an extension of US 195 and a spur route created in 1979.

=== Idaho ===
In April 2005, the Idaho legislature approved a bill to widen the entire highway from two lanes to four lanes for the entire route starting at the US-Canada port of entry in Eastport and ending at the border with Oregon in remote Owyhee County. The contract for the project was awarded to Washington Group International and CH2M Hill. The contract is worth more than $1.2 billion and is slated to last for more than six years, cover 13 major reconstruction projects, affecting over 250 miles (400 km) of the highway's nearly 460 miles (740 km) in the state.

The major factors in the reconstruction are due to the fact that US 95 is the only route that runs from north to south in western Idaho, starting at Eastport in the north and ending in remote Owyhee County; as well as safety concerns because there have been numerous accidents and fatalities on the narrow and very dangerous curves. This change started with the reconstruction and improvements made to White Bird Hill. Major projects have been undertaken including on the Coeur d'Alene Indian Reservation.

The first stage was completed in August 2005 from just south of Coeur d'Alene to Fighting Creek Road and is an upgraded four-lane highway for approximately ten miles (16 km). The second stage, from Fighting Creek Road to Lake Creek on the Coeur d'Alene Indian Reservation, was completed in late July-early August 2006 and upgraded a seven-mile (11 km) stretch of the highway. The third stage, from Lake Creek to Worley, started mid-to-late 2006 and was completed in 2008. This section is significant, as it is on the Coeur d'Alene Indian Reservation. The "new" highway bypasses the Coeur d'Alene Casino, the largest business on the reservation, with the old highway becoming an alternate route that will connect the highway to the casino and the more remote regions of the reservation. This project improved a 20-mile (32 km) stretch of highway and shortened the length of the highway by about 20 miles (32 km).

Also, a nearly 20-mile (32 km) stretch was completed in 2007 from just north of Lewiston to 6 miles (10 km) south of Moscow.

== Future ==
=== Nevada ===
Future Interstate 11
- Location: Las Vegas – Fernley
- Length: 395.807 mi (636.990 km)

US 95 is part of a proposed northwestward extension of Interstate 11 (I-11) from Las Vegas. The interstate highway would primarily follow the US 95 corridor through central and northwestern Nevada, extending to I-80 near Reno and Sparks via Tonopah. In 2018, the Nevada Department of Transportation had initiated public outreach regarding its long-range planning efforts to narrow down options for the future I-11 corridor.

== Major intersections ==
Arizona
Calle 1 at the Mexico–US border in San Luis
I-8 in Yuma
I-10 in Quartzsite. The highways travel concurrently to Blythe, California.
California
I-40 in Needles. The highways travel concurrently to west-northwest of Needles.
Nevada
I-11 / US 93 in Boulder City. The highways travel concurrently to Las Vegas.
I-215 in Henderson
I-15 / US 93 in Las Vegas
US 6 in Tonopah. The highways travel concurrently to Coaldale.
US 50 in Fallon. The highways travel concurrently through Fallon.
I-80 south-southwest of Lovelock. The highways travel concurrently to Winnemucca.
Oregon
No major intersections
Idaho
US 20 / US 26 southeast of Parma. The highways travel concurrently to north-northeast of Parma.
I-84 south of Fruitland
US 30 south of Fruitland. The highways travel concurrently to Fruitland.
US 12 west of Spalding. The highways travel concurrently to Lewiston.
US 195 north-northwest of Lewiston
I-90 in Coeur d'Alene
US 2 in Sandpoint. The highways travel concurrently to north-northeast of Bonners Ferry.
Highway 95 at the Canada–US border in Eastport

== See also ==
- U.S. Route 95 Spur
- U.S. Route 95 Alternate
- U.S. Route 95 Truck (unsigned Nevada SR 362)

Browse numbered routes
← SR 93	AZ	→ SR 95
← OR 86	OR	→ US 97
