= Crosthwait =

Crosthwait is a surname. Notable people with the surname include:

- David Crosthwait (1898–1976), African-American mechanical and electrical engineer, inventor, and writer
- Irwin Crosthwait (1914–1981), Canadian painter
- Joseph Crosthwait (1681–?), English astronomer
