= International Selkirk Loop =

Scenic highway in Idaho and Washington, and British Columbia

International Selkirk Loop
- International Selkirk Loop highlighted in red

Route information
- Maintained by MoTI, ITD, and WSDOT
- Length: 280 mi (450 km)
- Existed: 1999–present
- Component highways: Highway 3A; Highway 6; Highway 21; SH-1; US 2; US 95; SR 20; SR 31

Major junctions
- Tourist loop around the Selkirk Mountains

Location
- Countries: Canada, United States
- Provinces: British Columbia
- States: Idaho, Washington

Highway system
- British Columbia provincial highways
- Idaho State Highway System; Interstate; US; State
- State highways in Washington; Interstate; US; State; Scenic; Pre-1964; 1964 renumbering; Former

The International Selkirk Loop is a 280-mile-long (450 km) scenic highway in the U.S. states of Idaho and Washington, as well as the Canadian province of British Columbia. The loop encircles the Selkirk Mountain Range, and offers several side trips aside from the main route. Included on the loop is the Kootenay Lake Ferry, the longest free ferry in the world. The portion of the loop in the United States has been designated an All-American Road by the United States Department of Transportation.

== Route description ==
=== Washington ===
The International Selkirk Loop begins on U.S. Route 2 at the Washington-Idaho state line, in the city of Newport. The highway proceeds west for a short distance, passing several buildings, before U.S. Route 2 splits off, and the Loop designation transfers to Washington State Route 20. The highway proceeds northwest, traveling parallel to the Pend Oreille River. The road continues, intersecting several small roads before entering the community of Usk and intersecting Washington State Route 211. The roadway bends northward, passing the community of Cusick and continuing parallel to the Pend Oreille. Continuing northward, the highway intersects several small roads, and makes a large northeastward bend, before returning to traveling northward. It proceeds north, passing through a small portion of Colville National Forest, before entering Ione. While traveling through Ione, WA 20 splits off, and the Loop designation transfers to Washington State Route 31. Continuing northward, the roadway passes the Ione Municipal Airport, proceeding parallel to the Pend Oreille River, before crossing over the river and entering Colville National Forest. The road proceeds north, intersecting several small forest roads, before reaching the Canada–US border, where the WA 31 designation ends. The loop enters Canada, and the designation transfers to British Columbia Highway 6.

=== British Columbia ===
After entering British Columbia, the Loop proceeds northward, traveling parallel to a small creek. After intersecting several smaller roads, BC 6 intersects British Columbia Highway 3, which runs concurrently with the highway. The highway proceeds north, continuing along the course of the small creek, intersecting several small roads. After several miles, BC 3 splits off the highway. The route proceeds through the community of Salmo before proceeding northeast. The road bends northwestward, before zigzagging along a valley floor. The roadway passes to the west of West Arm Provincial Park, and enters the community of Nelson. In Nelson, the Loop's designation transfers to British Columbia Highway 3A at a trumpet interchange. The road passes northeast through Nelson, before passing over an arm of the Kootenay Lake, and traveling eastward along the arm of the lake. The Loop designation transfers to the Kootenay Lake Ferry at the intersection of BC 3A and BC 31. The ferry is approximately 5.4 miles (8.7 km) in length, and connects the loop to the eastern shore of the lake. After crossing the lake, BC 3A continues eastward, passing several small buildings. The road passes through Crawford Bay before bending south and traveling along one of the arms of the lake. While traveling along the lakeshore, the highway passes through the community of Gray Creek, and passes west of Lockhart Creek Provincial Park. The roadway passes along Duck lake, before intersecting several small roads. The road enters Creston where the Loop's designation transfers to British Columbia Highway 21. The highway continues south, through Creston, passing numerous buildings which make up a portion of the community. The highway proceeds southward, running parallel to a large river, continuing to the Canada–US border, where the BC 21 designation terminates. The Loop reenters the United States, and the designation transfers to Idaho State Highway 1.

=== Idaho ===
The highway proceeds southeast, through the community of Porthill, before bending slightly northeastward. The road bends back southeast, and proceeds through rural area, before reaching an intersection with U.S. Route 95. The road proceeds southward, through rural area, occasionally intersecting a small road. After continuing southward, the highway intersects U.S. Route 2, which continues concurrently with the highway. The road proceeds south, crossing over the Kootenai River, before entering the community of Bonners Ferry. The roadway continues southeast, intersecting several small roads, and passing several buildings. The route proceeds southeast, intersecting several small roads, and passing west of the Kaniksu National Forest. The road proceeds south, entering the community of Sandpoint and reaching an interchange with Idaho State Highway 200, where U.S. Route 95 splits off from the highway. The roadway continues westward, traveling parallel to the Pend Oreille River, and intersecting the occasional small road. It enters the community of Priest River and passes the Priest River Municipal Airport. The highway intersects Idaho State Highway 57, before continuing west out of the town. The highway continues eastward, crossing over the Pend Oreille River, and reaching the Washington-Idaho state line, where the Loop begins again.

== Major intersections ==
State/Province	County/Regional District	Location	mi	km	Destinations	Notes
Washington	Pend Oreille	Newport	0.0	0.0	US 2	Begin loop at Idaho–Washington border
Washington	Pend Oreille	Newport	0.1– 0.2	0.16– 0.32	US 2 / SR 20	Loop designation transfers to Washington Highway 20
Washington	Pend Oreille		15.6	25.1	SR 211	
Washington	Pend Oreille	Ione	46.6	75.0	SR 20 / SR 31	Loop designation transfers to WA 31
Metaline Falls–Nelway Border Crossing			73.4	118.1	Canada–United States border	
British Columbia	Central Kootenay	Nelway	79.9	128.6	Highway 6	After border, continue north on BC 6
British Columbia	Central Kootenay	Salmo	88.7	142.7	Highway 3	
British Columbia	Central Kootenay	Nelson	113.8	183.1	Highway 3A	Continue northeast on BC 3A
British Columbia	Central Kootenay	Kootenay Lake	135.2– 140.7	217.6– 226.4	Kootenay Lake Ferry	
British Columbia	Central Kootenay	Creston	189.2	304.5	Highway 3	
British Columbia	Central Kootenay	Creston	190.1	305.9	Highway 21	Continue south on BC 21
Porthill-Rykerts Border Crossing			198.9	320.1	Canada–United States border	
Idaho	Boundary	Porthill	190.1	305.9	SH-1	After border, continue south on SH-1
Idaho	Boundary		211.2	339.9	US 2 / US 95	SH-1 becomes US-2 / US-95
Idaho	Boundary		222.6	358.2	US 2	Continue west on US-2 to Idaho–Washington border
Idaho	Bonner	Sandpoint	234.9	378.0	SH-200	Interchange
Idaho	Bonner	Priest River	260.0	418.4	SH-57	
			288.7	464.6	Idaho-Washington state line	
1.000 mi = 1.609 km; 1.000 km = 0.621 mi

== Gallery ==
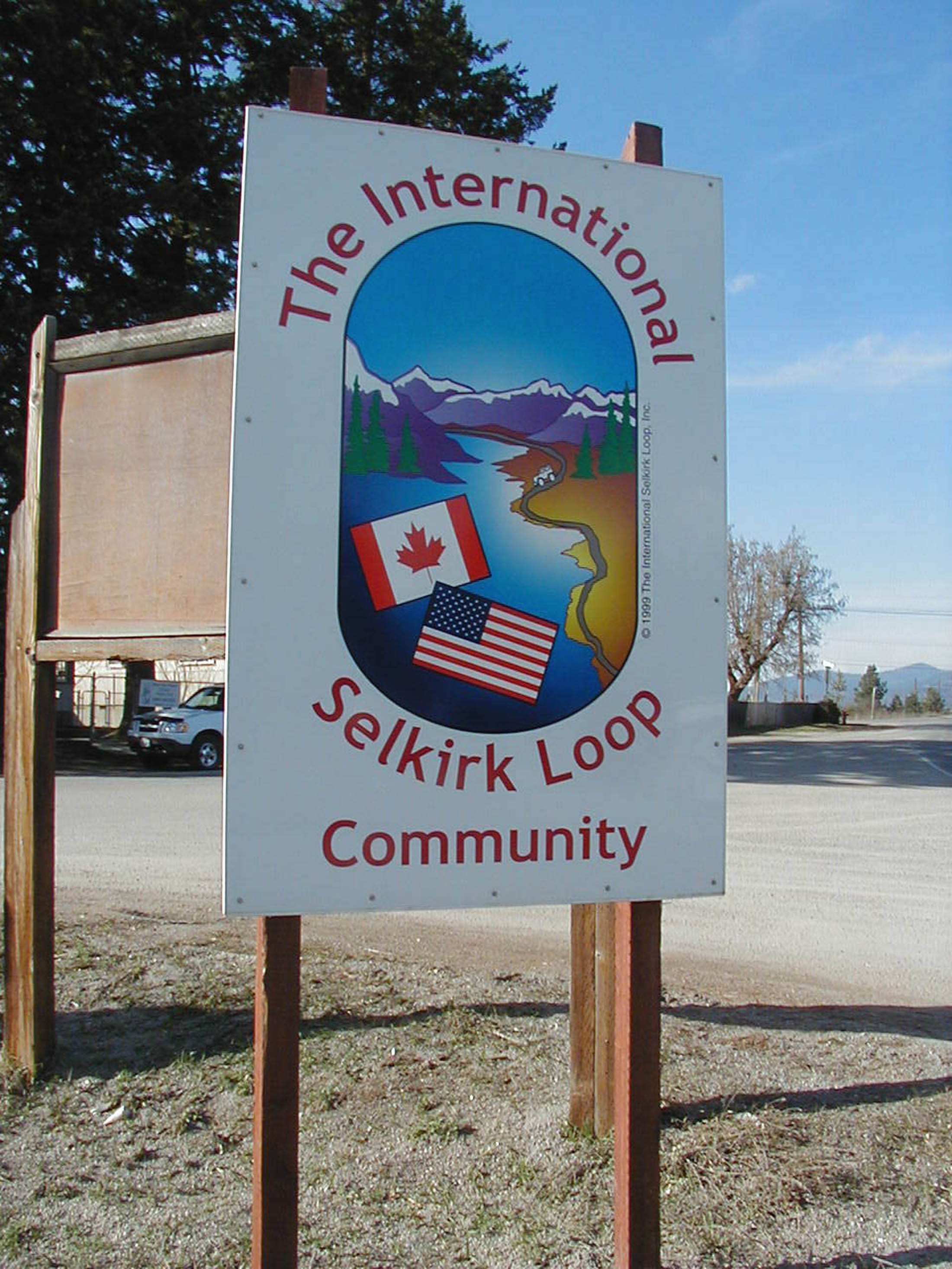
An International Selkirk Loop wayfinding sign. These are used at the entrances to communities on the loop.

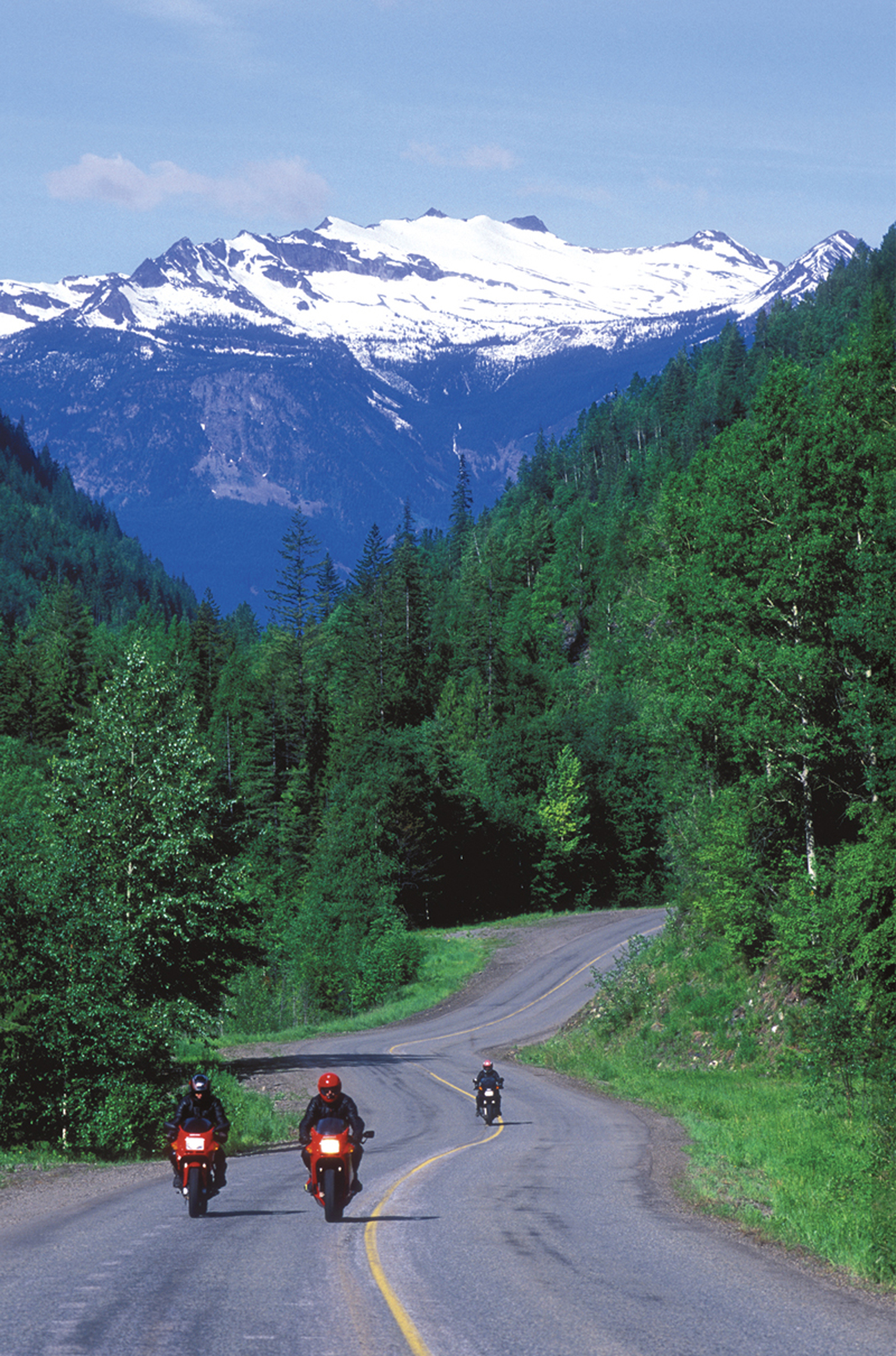
Motorcycles on the International Selkirk Loop, Colville National Forest, northeast Washington

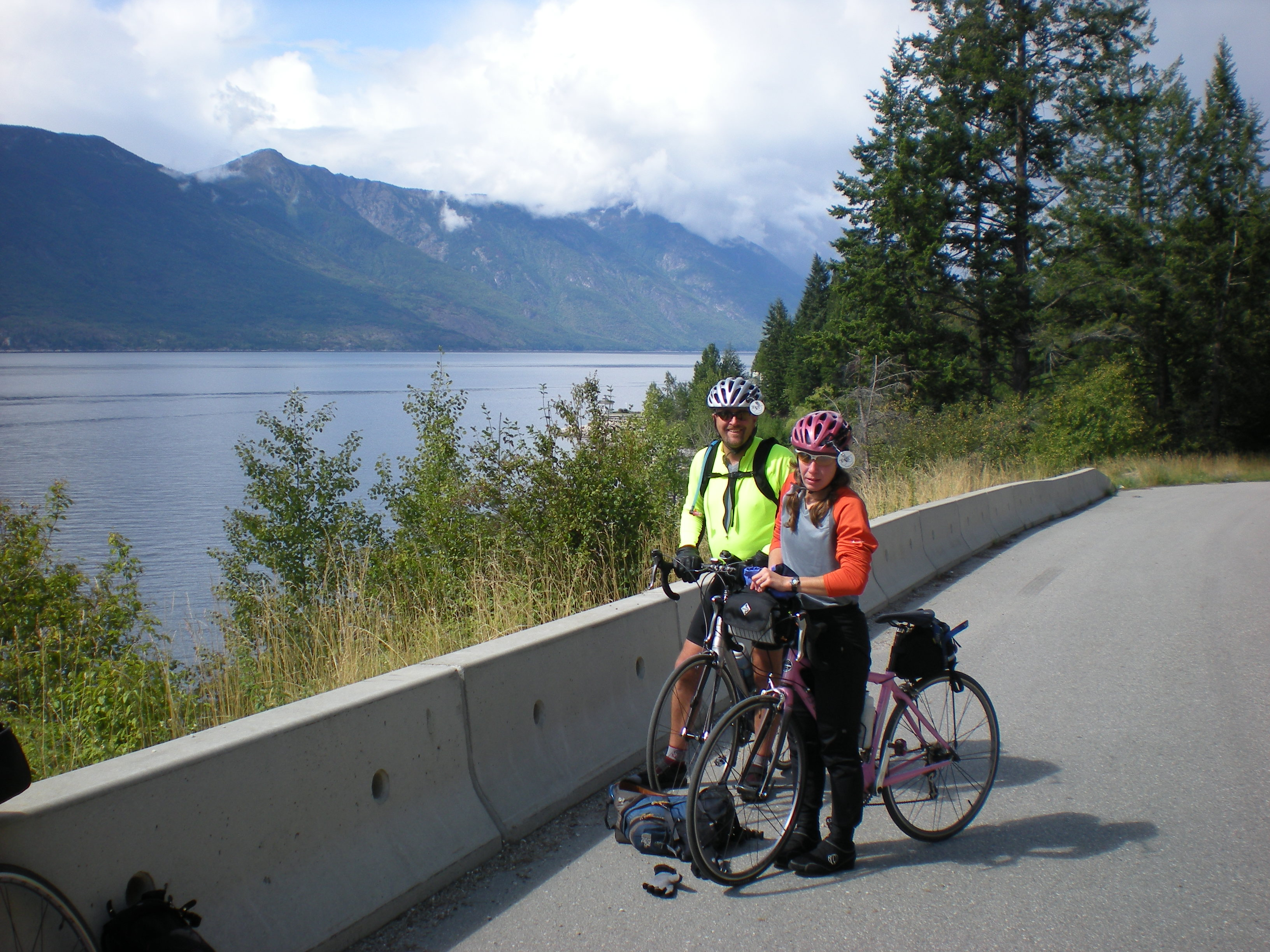
Cyclists on the International Selkirk Loop near Kootenay Lake, British Columbia
