= Gordon School (disambiguation) =

Gordon School is a coeducational, independent school located in East Providence, Rhode Island.

Gordon School may also refer to:

- General Gordon Elementary School, an elementary school in Vancouver, British Columbia
- Gordon Bell High School, a public junior and senior high school in Winnipeg, Manitoba, Canada
- Gordon Divinity School, a divinity school in Massachusetts
- Gordon Graydon Memorial Secondary School, a high school in Mississauga, Ontario, Canada
- Gordon Greenwood Elementary School, a public elementary school in Langley, British Columbia
- The Gordon Schools, Huntly, Aberdeenshire, Scotland

Gordon High School can refer to:

- Gordon High School (Georgia) in Decatur, Georgia
- Gordon High School (Texas) in Gordon, Texas
- Gordon High School (Nebraska) in Gordon, Nebraska
- Gordon Junior High School (former name of Rose L. Hardy Middle School) in Washington, DC

- Gordon Parks High School, a public alternative learning center located in Saint Paul, Minnesota
- Gordon Sargent Primary School, a public elementary school in Nelson, British Columbia
- Gordon Tech High School, a Roman Catholic high school located in Chicago, Illinois

== See also ==
- Gordon's School
