= Kootenay River Secondary School =

Kootenay River Secondary

Location
- 223 18th Ave. S. Creston, British Columbia, V0B 1G0; Canada; 49.0944°N 116.5048°W

Information
- School type: Public, high school
- School board: School District 8 Kootenay Lake
- Superintendent: Trish Smillie
- School number: 886007
- Principal: Darryl Adams
- Staff: 43
- Grades: 8-12
- Enrollment: 529 (2025/2026)
- Language: English
- Team name: Bulldogs
- Website: https://krs.sd8.bc.ca/
- Last updated: October 3, 2026

Kootenay River Secondary School (formerly named Prince Charles Secondary and Creston Valley Secondary School) is a public high school in Creston, British Columbia, Canada; part of School District 8 Kootenay Lake. The school provides a range of activities that students can enroll in, and many clubs as well.

Originally called Prince Charles Secondary, the school decide to remove that name in mid-2021, following a request by a teacher as part of a reconciliation process with the First Nations in British Columbia. After temporarily changing the name to Creston Valley Secondary School, the school district in December 2021 voted to adopt the permanent name of Kootenay River Secondary School.

== See also ==
- Monarchy in British Columbia
- Royal eponyms in Canada
