= Idaho State Highway 1 =

State highway Boundary County, Idaho, United States

State Highway 1
- North and South Highway Copeland – Porthill Branch; Copeland – Porthill Road
- ID 1 highlighted in red

Route information
- Maintained by ITD
- Length: 11.185 mi (18.001 km)
- Existed: c. 1926–present
- Tourist routes: Part of the International Selkirk Loop

Major junctions
- South end: US 95 near Copeland
- North end: Highway 21 at the Canadian border in Porthill

Location
- Country: United States
- State: Idaho
- Counties: Boundary

Highway system
- Idaho State Highway System; Interstate; US; State
← SH-200	→ US 2

State Highway 1 (SH-1) is a state highway in Boundary County, in the U.S. state of Idaho. It extends 11.185 miles (18.00 km) from U.S. Route 95 (US-95) east of Copeland, north to British Columbia Highway 21 (BC 21) in Porthill. The route serves as a connector between Bonners Ferry, via US-95 south, Porthill, and Creston, BC. The highway is one of two border crossings from Idaho into British Columbia. The other crossing is at the US-95/BC 95 in Eastport. The highway is also known for being the only state highway in Boundary County, the two other highways are US-95 and US-2. The highway is also part of the International Selkirk Loop, the only international scenic byway in North America.

== Route description ==
SH-1 runs 11.92 miles (19.18 km) from U.S. Route 95 (US-95) east of Copeland, north to BC 21 in Porthill. The route links Bonners Ferry, via US-95 south, Porthill, and Creston, BC. The road is the only state highway in Boundary County; the two other highways are US-95 and US-2. The highway starts at an intersection with US-95 east of Copeland.

== History ==
SH-1 was originally created in the 1920s as part of Sampson Trail B, which ran from Boise north to Lewiston, Coeur d'Alene, before entering British Columbia at Porthill. Later in the mid-1930s, Idaho adopted a new numbered highway system with SH-1 as one of the first highways. The International Selkirk Loop, which uses SH-1, was formed in 1999. The loop became an Idaho Scenic byway on January 21, 2004, as the Wild Horse Trail.

== Major intersections ==
The entire route is in Boundary County.

Location	mi	km	Destinations	Notes
Copeland	0.000	0.000	US 95 – Bonners Ferry	Southern terminus
Porthill	11.130	17.912	U.S. Customs Building	
Porthill	11.185	18.001	Highway 21 – Creston	Continuation into British Columbia
1.000 mi = 1.609 km; 1.000 km = 0.621 mi

== See also ==
- List of state highways in Idaho
- List of highways numbered 1
