= Porthill-Rykerts Border Crossing =

Border crossing between Canada and the United States

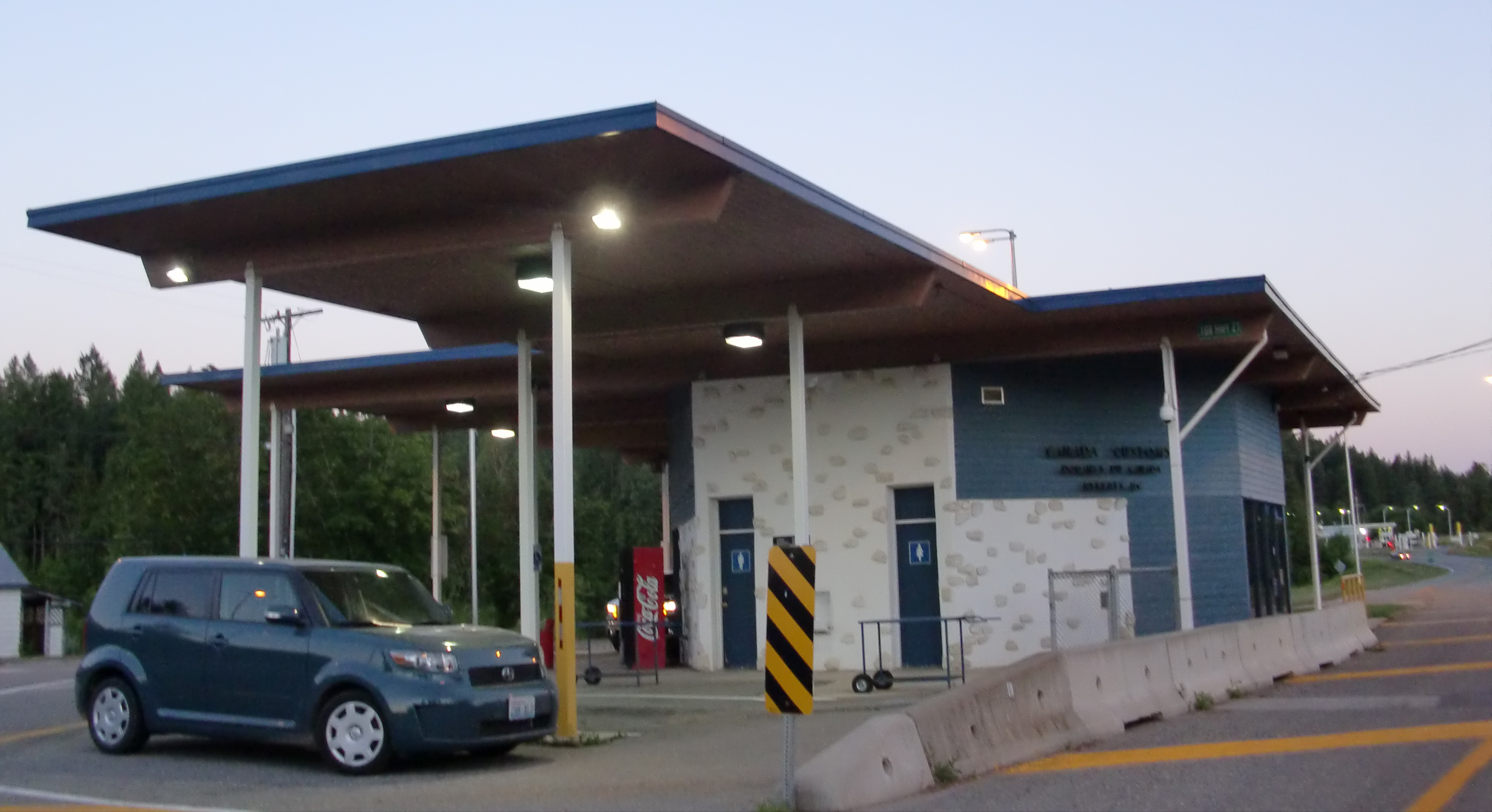
- Canadian Border Inspection Station at Rykerts, British Columbia

Location
- Country: United States; Canada
- Location: SH-1 / Highway 21; US Port: 12222 Idaho Highway 1, Porthill, Idaho 83853; Canadian Port: 108 Highway 21, Creston, British Columbia V0B 1G2
- Coordinates: 49°00′00″N 116°29′58″W

Details
- Opened: 1883

Website
- Porthill
- U.S. Inspection Station – Porthill, Idaho
- U.S. National Register of Historic Places
- NRHP reference No.: 14000252
- Added to NRHP: May 22, 2014

The Porthill-Rykerts Border Crossing connects the town of Bonners Ferry, Idaho with Creston, British Columbia on the Canada–US border. Idaho State Highway 1 on the American side joins British Columbia Highway 21 on the Canadian side, which continues north towards Creston. The Porthill-Rykerts Border Crossing is used as the American Port only; Rykerts acts as the Canadian Crossing.

Porthill is an unincorporated community in Boundary County, Idaho, United States, located at the Canada–United States border into British Columbia. It is one of only three Ports of entry for Idaho into Canada. (#3308) It is named for founder Charles Plummer Hill, as is Hillcrest Mines, now part of the Municipality of Crowsnest Pass, Alberta. The north-flowing Kootenai River is just west of Porthill.

== Initial settlement ==
In 1860, a boundary cairn was erected on the east bank of the Kootenai River. The former US name was Ockonook, meaning "a grassy hillside with rocks." Around 1871, David McLoughlin and family relocated south from the Kootenay Flats to Ockonook, where he built a log house, which also served as a trading post and a hostel for prospectors traveling downstream. In 1878, prospector George Wallace Hall preempted 320 acres (129 ha) in today's Lister, British Columbia.

== Steamboat era ==
In 1883, John C. Rykert established a Canadian customs station immediately north of the boundary to intercept steamboats and other river traffic sailing from Bonners Ferry to Kootenay Lake. Rykert was a customs officer, immigration inspector, gold commissioner's agent, and registrar of shipping.

By 1890, Mike Driscoll was proprietor of the Palace hotel at what was then known as Rykert's custom-house. To Mr. & Mrs. Richard Wood, Ockinook residents, were born children in 1891 and 1892, before the family moved to the Creston Valley in 1898.

Major Joseph I. Barnes was the US inspector of customs until the end of Benjamin Harrison's presidential term in 1893. That year, Barnes became the inaugural US postmaster at Ockonook. Charles Plummer Hill took over as the US customs officer, a position he held for 10 years.

William Roger Huscroft and family rafted down the north-flowing Kootenai River to Ockonook, crossing the border in September 1891 to settle just on the other side. The family built a log cabin across the river, which the 1894 spring flood reached, requiring towing to higher elevations as the waters rose. Consequently, the family relocated to Lister, part of which is known as Huscroft.

Prior to Miss Agnes McKay becoming the inaugural government school teacher at Ockonook in 1895, David McLoughlin taught the settlers' children from both sides of the boundary using a room in Mike Driscoll's rudimentary hotel. The McLoughlin farm residence was 200 yards (183 m) south of the boundary. In the mid-1890s, Clarke Quarrie was proprietor of the Boundary Line hotel.

By 1897, J.I. Barnes also ran a general store. That year, McLoughlin received a land patent for 120 acres (49 ha) on the present site of Porthill. C.P. Hill challenged the title, but prior to a court case, Hill purchased 80 acres (32 ha) from McLoughlin. That year, as postmaster, Hill succeeded in renaming the settlement Porthill (called Port Hill by the railroad). Hillcrest Mines, now part of the Municipality of Crowsnest Pass, Alberta, is also named after Hill.

From 1897, the place name Bedlington was synonymous with Rykerts. Bedlington was a mining camp in the boundary vicinity. The Bedlington & Nelson (B&N) stop immediately north of the boundary initially assumed this name but had been renamed Rykerts by 1904. Over time, the Bedlington name fell into general disuse.

During the 1890s, provincial Constable Sloan was stationed at Rykerts, and beef drives from Alberta commonly came south into the US and north through Porthill.

== Cemetery ==
In the cemetery on a hill above Porthill, the oldest burial site is for Louisa Sloop (wife of John), dated 1898. In addition to farming, resident J.E. Sloop was a merchant. In 1907, John Jacob Stitch bought part of the Sloop property. The IOOF chapter, which founded in 1901, bought an acre from Stitch in 1908 for a cemetery. The Roman Catholic Church later similarly purchased half an acre from him. On the lodge closure in 1972, the Porthill Community Cemetery Association, became the cemetery owner.

== Train era ==
During the construction of the Kootenai Valley/Bedlington & Nelson railways, Great Northern Railway (GN) subsidiaries, the prime construction contractor operated a hospital at Port Hill. In October 1899, the Bedlington depot was built and the rail head passed northward across the boundary in advancing from Bonners Ferry to Wynndel. Southward to Bonners Ferry opened, but northward did not open until late 1900. In the interim, the latter portion continued to be worked by a steamer, including through the winter.

The terminal for regular train service quickly cut back to Wynndel, then Creston. Certainly by February 1904, the three times weekly mixed train ran no farther north than Creston. In 1907, the Yale-Columbia Lumber Co. established a new lumber camp, accessed from a spur at Rykerts. The next year, the company Shay locomotive with three cars ran out of control and derailed on the spur. Two crew members escaped, but the engineer died from a broken neck. In 1911, the three occupants of a horse-drawn sleigh traveling along the track escaped serious injury when struck by a train near the Yale-Columbia crossing.

In December 1914, the final twice weekly mixed train ran north to Creston, and the Wynndel–Porthill track was lifted in 1916.

In 1915, Port Hill became the northern terminal for the mixed train. About 1927, all passenger service ended. Freight service ceased in the 1970s.

== Road passengers ==
In 1892, Sam Smith extended his stage service beyond Bonners Ferry to Ockonook, important especially during the wintertime, when ice could block river traffic. The service soon became Bonners Ferry–Kootenay Landing. The wagon roads were rough, but the winter sleigh travel was smoother. The hotel and saloon accommodation at Porthill was satisfactory. However, at Chambers City (south end of Duck Lake), a necessary destination when ice blocked the river upstream, William H. Chambers ran the only establishment. His Palace hotel, operating from 1893 to possibly as late as 1897, lacked beds, benches and chairs, and served only beverages, but meals may have been provided initially. After the railroad construction contract was let in mid-1898, Smith foresaw his service as redundant and retired from staging to his ranch on the west side of the Kootenay River above Porthill.

During the mid-1910s, Dunc. Cameron operated a Porthill–Bonners Ferry auto stage. In 1923, a new Creston–Bonners Ferry daily auto stage commenced.

In 1930, the Cranbrook–Spokane motorcoach began using the crossing after gravelling of the hill to the south eliminated the need for chains. In summer during that decade, buses to Spokane could complete the Creston–Porthill route in 20 minutes.

Creston Bus Lines provided a Creston–Porthill service at least for 1947–1953.

== Canadian highway and Rykerts ==
By 1909, the Creston–Porthill highway was considered good. The next year, the wagon road from Erickson was upgraded for auto travel. During the 1910s, the condition of the Creston highway was considered inferior to the highway south of the boundary.

In 1922, J.C. Rykert retired as the border officer after 40 years continuous service. In 1920, less than 200 cars used the crossing, but in 1926 about 4,000 cars and 18,000 persons crossed. In 1928, a new road (present Highway 21) was built from Creston upon the abandoned K.V. Railway right-of-way, and a customs office doubled in size was erected. The 1929 crossings were 9,722 autos and 29,230 people. The statistics exclude the immediate local traffic. The next year handled 13,233 autos and 45,421 persons.

During 1934, the road was being upgraded to a standard width highway. The opening of a good highway for the Eastport–Kingsgate Border Crossing caused a 10 per cent drop in traffic for the 1934 Rykerts crossings, which recorded 11,512 autos and 36,892 passengers.

In 1956, paving of the highway was completed.

In 2014–15, 270,085 travellers crossed at the port of entry. A new facility was built in 2017 to replace the previous building erected in 1972.

In the April 2020 COVID-19 restrictions, Canada reduced the previous border hours of 8:00am to midnight (winter) and 7:00am to 11:00pm (summer), to 7:00am to 5:00pm every day. The prior hours were reinstated, effective 31 March 2023.

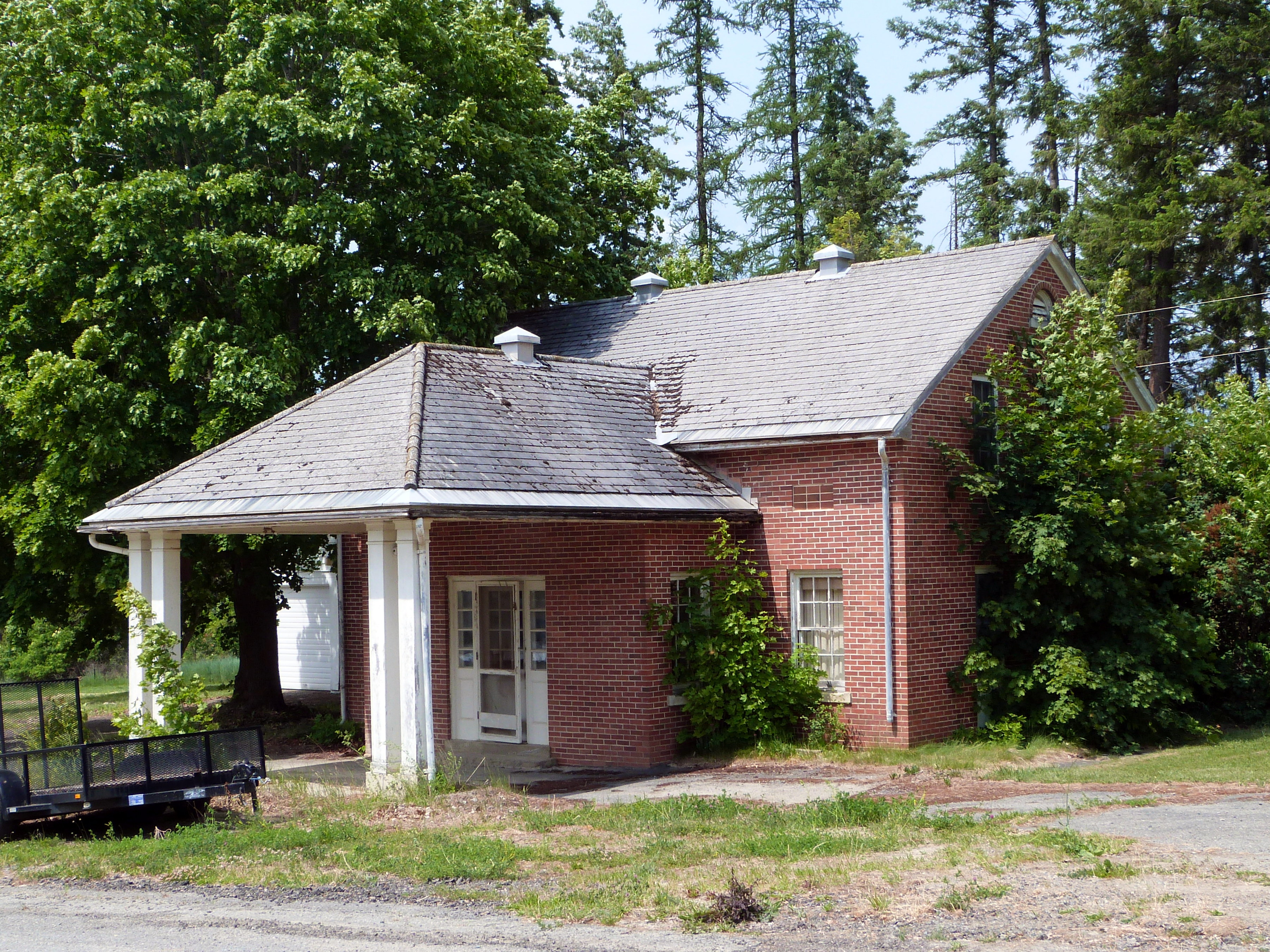
Former US border station at Porthill, Idaho

== US highway and Porthill (post-1900) ==
In 1909, Geo. Price sold the Porthill hotel, and C.J. McClure, the GN station agent, purchased the Barnes general store. At this time, Martin Peterson and H.S. French were also storekeepers.

In 1911, the former Whitney hotel became a restaurant. The next year, Jim English reopened his hotel. Joe Stick was mayor during this period. In 1913, John T. Lingrell (Ingram?) and Mark F. Kelly purchased the J.W. Gardner store. In 1915, a fire started in a shack alongside the Whitney hotel. Destroyed were the Whitney and English hotels, their stables, the Ingram and Kelly general store and implement warehouse, the unoccupied Billings hotel, and a former poolroom/barbershop. Surviving were a barbershop, Spot's saloon, and the H.A. French general store/post office. With state prohibition imminent, only the Ingram and Kelly store was rebuilt. Later that year, Sam T. Jordan opened a store.

Ernest D. King settled in Porthill around 1904 and married resident Mabel Smith in 1915. Hartley Lester King was born in 1916. Hartley died in Bonners Ferry in 2018, three weeks shy of his 102nd birthday.

In 1925, a new highway north was within 8 miles (13 km) of the border.

In 1932, a service station and lunch room opened at Porthill.

In 1967, the US replaced its 1938 brick border station with the current wooden structure. A redesign of the road approach positioned the new facility in a different location, preserving the former building. In 2014, the old border station was added to the National Register of Historic Places listings in Boundary County, Idaho.

A post office and tavern with gas bar exist at Porthill.

US border post hours are identical to the Canadian ones.

== Porthill ferry ==
In 1915, a new 100-ton ferry was installed for crossing the river at Porthill. In 1920, the Boundary county commissioners let a contract for the construction of a replacement ferry.

Around the 1960s, a logging truck boarded the river-crossing ferry on the western shore. J.H. Huscoft Co. owned the ancient vehicle, which had hauled a load from the Selkirk Mountains via an access road which traversed the boundary. Positioned at the front of the ferry, the vehicle was in neutral with the motor running. The ferry pulling away from the shore jolted the empty cab, which jerked the shift into low gear. Slowly, the truck moved forward, forced down the front apron of the ferry, and plunged into the river, where the logs provided flotation. After the ferry pushed the load to the eastern shore, a bulldozer towed the vehicle up the ramp out of the river. The motor restarted, the truck continued on its way to the company sawmill at Creston.

The Porthill ferry operated at least till the mid-1960s.

== Climate ==
Porthill has a humid continental climate (Köppen Dfb) with some mediterranean (Csb) influences.

Climate data for Porthill, Idaho (1991–2020 normals, extremes since 1893)
Month	Jan	Feb	Mar	Apr	May	Jun	Jul	Aug	Sep	Oct	Nov	Dec	Year
Record high °F (°C)	54 (12)	60 (16)	77 (25)	87 (31)	96 (36)	107 (42)	108 (42)	103 (39)	97 (36)	87 (31)	69 (21)	59 (15)	108 (42)
Mean maximum °F (°C)	47 (8)	50 (10)	61 (16)	74 (23)	85 (29)	89 (32)	96 (36)	97 (36)	87 (31)	72 (22)	56 (13)	47 (8)	97 (36)
Mean daily maximum °F (°C)	35.5 (1.9)	40.2 (4.6)	50.0 (10.0)	60.4 (15.8)	70.7 (21.5)	75.7 (24.3)	85.5 (29.7)	85.6 (29.8)	74.1 (23.4)	58.2 (14.6)	44.1 (6.7)	35.5 (1.9)	59.6 (15.3)
Daily mean °F (°C)	28.2 (−2.1)	31.1 (−0.5)	38.8 (3.8)	47.1 (8.4)	56.4 (13.6)	61.9 (16.6)	68.8 (20.4)	67.6 (19.8)	58.1 (14.5)	45.7 (7.6)	35.7 (2.1)	28.4 (−2.0)	47.3 (8.5)
Mean daily minimum °F (°C)	20.9 (−6.2)	21.9 (−5.6)	27.7 (−2.4)	33.8 (1.0)	42.0 (5.6)	48.1 (8.9)	52.1 (11.2)	49.5 (9.7)	42.1 (5.6)	33.1 (0.6)	27.4 (−2.6)	21.2 (−6.0)	35.0 (1.7)
Mean minimum °F (°C)	2 (−17)	5 (−15)	14 (−10)	26 (−3)	31 (−1)	37 (3)	43 (6)	41 (5)	31 (−1)	22 (−6)	12 (−11)	5 (−15)	−5 (−21)
Record low °F (°C)	−31 (−35)	−29 (−34)	−17 (−27)	3 (−16)	17 (−8)	14 (−10)	28 (−2)	27 (−3)	19 (−7)	4 (−16)	−20 (−29)	−37 (−38)	−37 (−38)
Average precipitation inches (mm)	2.16 (55)	1.70 (43)	1.91 (49)	1.65 (42)	2.19 (56)	2.10 (53)	1.24 (31)	0.82 (21)	1.06 (27)	1.80 (46)	2.41 (61)	2.45 (62)	21.49 (546)
Average precipitation days (≥ 0.01 inch)	12	9	10	10	10	12	6	4	6	8	12	11	110
Source: National Oceanic and Atmospheric Administration

== Crime and calamity ==
- 1899: During the blasting of a nearby railroad cut, an explosion killed two construction employees. Months later, a construction worker shot a bookkeeper in the back of the head over a pay dispute. A group of 27 employees were placed in custody at Porthill pending trial. The next month, a police officer acting in self-defense fatally shot the Porthill dance hall proprietor, who had resisted arrest.
- 1901: A fatal stabbing occurred.
- Early 1900s: Several drownings occurred in this section of river.
- 1910–1911: Colin S. Smith and wife Ellen, who had an infant daughter, were involved in the following feud. Smith accused George S. Hewitt, his father-in-law, of prior incest regarding Ellen. Strongly supported by H.A. French, merchant and late justice of the peace, Hewitt was found not guilty. All parties were Porthill residents. Subsequently, Hewitt claimed Smith was not a fit parent, but the action faltered. Through the instigation of Smith's friends, French was arrested for illegally selling alcohol and was fined $100. In a later incident, Smith fired two shots point blank at Hewitt, who was visiting the ranch. Charged with attempted murder, Smith was jailed, then released, the prosecution witnesses having disappeared. On several later occasions, Smith warned off James Baker, who was visiting the ranch. Soon after, a driver transported Baker, Ellen Smith, and infant, to Erickson in his horse-drawn rig. In pursuit, Colin Smith walked the 7-mile (11 km) railroad right-of-way to Creston, the wagon road being double the distance. In an accident near Goat canyon, the rig was destroyed on falling 100 feet (30 m) down an embankment, but nobody was injured. Baker was arrested in Creston for carrying concealed weapons. The reunited Mr. and Mrs. Smith, with infant, happily returned to Port Hill.
- 1913: A robbery target, who shot to death his attacker in front of English's saloon, was found not guilty.
- 1999: A fugitive who ran the Rykerts crossing was pursued and apprehended by RCMP officers after an exchange of gunfire.

== Continental mine ==
In 1891, Billy Houston and Fred Sutter staked the claim in the Selkirk Mountains. The location was a one-week trek northward from the Sandpoint, Idaho railroad stop. In 1893, Albert K. Klockmann and John Manley bought the property, each holding a half interest in what became the Continental mine. By 1897, they planned a road to the Kootenay River for shipping ore by boat.

In 1901, the mine was incorporated as the Idaho Continental Mining Co, and the wagon road to Porthill was completed. In 1902, 12 horse teams were hauling 12 tons per day to the B&N at Porthill. After a fatality in 1902 and 1903 from thawing dynamite, activity ceased at the mine. During these two years 1,200 tons of high-grade silver-lead ore had been shipped.

In 1911, work began to reactivate the mine, which comprised 20 claims and a mile of underground workings. A concentrator and a power plant installed in 1913 cost $300,000. The 14-mile (23 km) access road was rebuilt. In 1916, a new concentrator with a 300-tons-per-day capacity was erected. That year, 72 cars of high-grade silver-lead were produced. Employees numbered about 200. From 1917, eight trucks joined the horse teams in hauling ore. While drawing gasoline from one of the half dozen tanks awaiting to be unloaded from a scow at Porthill, an employee placed a lantern too close, igniting all the fuel. Over a 10-month period, the mine shipped 175 carloads of concentrates. By 1919, the trucks had increased to 12, and the workforce reduced to 130.

The community, named Klockmann, had a post office. During the 1920s, employee numbers gradually fell. The removal of the electric plant in 1929 indicated the mine had permanently closed.

Limited mining continued until the 1950s. Nowadays, only a potentially toxic tailings pile remains.

== See also ==
- List of Canada–United States border crossings
