= CFQ (disambiguation) =

CFQ is an acronym that may refer to:

- Completely fair queueing, an I/O scheduler for the Linux kernel.
- Cinefantastique, a science fiction / fantasy magazine renamed CFQ
- Creston Aerodrome, (IATA code), Canada
- Cognitive Failures Questionnaire, in neuroticism
