= British Columbia Highway 21 =

Highway in British Columbia

Highway 21
- Creston-Rykerts Highway
- Highway 21 highlighted in red

Route information
- Maintained by the Ministry of Transportation and Infrastructure
- Length: 14.12 km (8.77 mi)
- Existed: 1964–present
- Tourist routes: Part of the International Selkirk Loop

Major junctions
- South end: SH-1 at the U.S. border in Rykerts
- North end: Highway 3 near Creston

Location
- Country: Canada
- Province: British Columbia

Highway system
- British Columbia provincial highways
← Highway 20	→ Highway 22

Highway 21 is a cross-border spur in the Regional District of Central Kootenay in British Columbia. First opened in 1964, the highway travels 14 km (8.70 mi) northwest along the Kootenay River from its connection with Idaho State Highway 1 at the Rykerts Canada-U.S. border crossing to a point on the Crowsnest Highway (Highway 3) just 1 km (0.62 mi) west of Creston.

Approximately 4 km (2.49 mi) from its northbound terminus, Highway 21 comes to an intersection with Erickson Street as it enters Creston. At this point, motorists intending to travel eastbound on the Crowsnest Highway toward Cranbrook and the Alberta border can bypass Creston's main business district and connect to the Crowsnest at Erickson. Westbound motorists can continue on Highway 21 to its northern terminus.

== Major intersections ==
The entire route is in Central Kootenay Regional District.

Location	km	mi	Destinations	Notes
Rykerts	0.00	0.00	SH-1 south – Bonners Ferry	Continuation into Idaho
Rykerts	0.00	0.00	Canada – United States border at Porthill-Rykerts Border Crossing	
Creston	14.12	8.77	Highway 3 (Crowsnest Highway) – Nelson, Castlegar	Northern terminus
1.000 mi = 1.609 km; 1.000 km = 0.621 mi
