= Copeland, Idaho =

Unincorporated community in Boundary County, Idaho, United States

Coordinates: 48°54′08″N 116°23′20″W

Copeland is an unincorporated community in Boundary County, Idaho, United States. Copeland lies on Idaho State Highway 1 north of its intersection with U.S. Route 95. Copeland is northwest of Bonners Ferry and close to the Idaho-British Columbia border.

The Pacific Northwest National Scenic Trail comes through Copeland on its 1,200 mile journey from the Continental Divide to the Pacific Ocean.

== History ==
Copeland's population was 25 in 1960.
