= David Downton =

- Born: 18 February 1959 (age 66); Kent, England
- Education: Canterbury; Wolverhampton
- Known for: Fashion illustration

David Downton (born 18 February 1959) is an English fashion illustrator. He worked for Vogue.

== Biography ==
David Downton was born in Kent, England in 1959. He studied at Canterbury (Foundation year 1977–1978) and Wolverhampton (BA hons illustration/graphics 1979–1981).

In 1984 he moved to Brighton and began his illustration career. He has worked on a wide variety of projects, including advertising, packaging, illustrating fiction, cook books, and, occasionally, fashion. His drawings from fashion shows have been published internationally.

In 2007, Downton launched Pourquoi Pas?, a journal of fashion illustration. He is a visiting professor at London College of Fashion.

He received an honorary doctorate from the Academy of Art University, San Francisco, in April 2009.

Downton is the artist in residence at London's Claridge's hotel, where he stays 52 nights a year in exchange for drawings.
