= Erickson, British Columbia =

Erickson
- Unincorporated community
- Location of Erickson in British Columbia
- Coordinates: 49°05′29″N 116°28′34″W
- Country: Canada
- Province: British Columbia
- Region: East Kootenay
- Regional district: Central Kootenay

Government
  - Governing body: Area 'B' –Director Tanya Wall
- Elevation: 620 m (2,030 ft)
- Time zone: UTC-7 (MST, PST)
- Postal code span: V0B 1G0
- Highways: 3; 21
- Waterways: Goat River

Erickson is an unincorporated community immediately to the east of Creston, British Columbia. It is home to many cherry and apple orchards and is located on Highway 3, also known as the Crowsnest Highway.

Erickson has one school, Erickson Elementary School, which is in School District 8 Kootenay Lake and has grades Kindergarten through Grade 7. Erickson has two wineries, three hotels, one gas station, a micro grocery, and a sawmill. There are also over 10 fruit stands scattered along the two main roads. (Highway 3 & Erickson Rd)

In 1926, the East Creston Irrigation District was established and for the first time, Erickson had fresh running water from Arrow Creek.

== History ==
The Erickson post office opened on 1 January 1908. The name "Erickson" was adopted for the local station in 1915 and was later listed as a post office in the 1930 BC Gazetteer. According to BC Geographical Names, the name is associated with Erickson Ridge and Erickson Creek, which were named after Eric Gustavous Erickson, a Canadian Pacific Railway superintendent at Cranbrook from 1904 to 1908.
