= Bernard Blossac =

French fashion illustrator

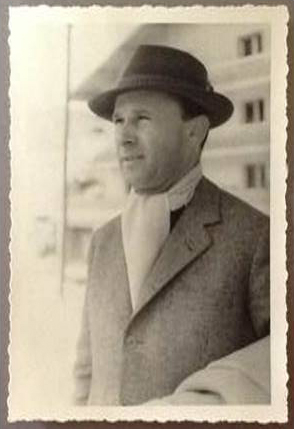
Bernard Blossac

Bernard de La Bourdonnaye-Blossac, also called Blossac (April 29, 1917 – December 1, 2002) was a French fashion illustrator.

Signature of Bernard Blossac

== Bibliography ==
Bernard de La Bourdonnaye-Blossac was born April 29, 1917, in Neuilly-sur-Seine.

He has a sister, Genevieve, born in 1919.

He spent his childhood in his family in Yonne and then in Paris. Outside school periods, the family went on trips. This was an opportunity for him to discover other horizons: Ireland, the Normandy coast, Switzerland, Belgium and the Côte d'Azur. A large property in Sologne "The Clarinerie" allowed his parents to satisfy their passion for hunting. Bernard did not like this sport and preferred to deal in drawing or painting landscapes or still lifes.

Very early he was interested in the aesthetics of things: furniture, paintings and clothing. He was passionate about all of the Art Nouveau creations of that time.

He stopped traditional education and entered a drawing workshop in the Montparnasse district of Paris: with André Marchand, then with Maurice Testard at the Grande Chaumière and finally with Paul Colin. For many years he worked to perfect his technique, using different tools: pencil, charcoal, pencil, chalk, etc. He also worked on special topics such as sets and costumes. During those years, he did particularly comprehensive studies on the costumes worn in the 19th century with many annotated drawings.

This period lasted until 1941, during which he met Robert Piguet, the great couturier, who would later introduce him with Paul Caldaquès, President of the Chambre Syndicale de la Couture. The latter presented him to the leaders of magazines such as Vogue, Femina or L'Officiel de la couture et de la mode de Paris. Immediately, they bought from him drawings as leaders for Adam magazine, l'art et la mode de Paris, les cahiers de l'Artisane COUTURE also for instance.

From the years immediately after the war, he drew for foreign journals: English, American, Dutch and Swiss. He traveled to London and New York to diversify his business. His business continued uninterrupted for thirty years.

He mixes his passion for fashion with his mastery of drawings of landscapes and interiors. Sometimes he inserted some drawings of models with previously worked interior designs.

His drawings were published in magazines, newspapers, sometimes more rarely displays (e.g. for Franck & Fils store).

He ended his professional activity in 1973. Very quickly afterward, several institutions asked to benefit from his drawings for cultural initiatives.

The Palais Galliera, Fashion Museum of the City of Paris own several of his drawings. Foreign collectors also bought some of his drawings.

Although having no more strictly professional activities, he continued to draw for his personal fun especially during his vacation he takes every summer in Divonne near the Swiss border. Many notebooks pencil drawings date from this period.

He died on December 1, 2002, in his birth town. From his death, the influence of his work is provided by the son of his sister, he had adopted, Alain Matrand de La bourdonnaye-Blossac.

== Couturier ==
He worked with top Couturier and fashion houses such as:

- Christian Dior,
- Jacques Fath,
- Robert Piguet,
- Jean Dessès,
- Balenciaga,
- Worth,
- Carven.
- Givenchy

== Exhibitions ==
At Granville in 1996 in the family house of Christian Dior transformed in a museum was held the exhibition " Images de mode 1940-1960 hommage à Bernard Blossac " for which of course many drawings were presented.

Several other museums organized exhibitions for which drawings were loaned :

- In 1980, display of several drawings at the Galliera Museum in Paris.
- In 1985, display of several drawings at the Musée Historique des Tissus in Lyon for a Balenciaga exhibition.
- In 1992, display of several drawings at a Balenciaga exhibition in Melbourne.
- In 1995, display of several drawings at the Palais Galliera in Paris.
- In 2007, display at the Kunstbibliothek Staatliche Museum in Berlin during the exhibition "Christian Dior und Deutschland 1947 bis 1957" and the Museum fur Angewandte Cologne Kunst.
- In 2010, several drawings exhibition at the Design Museum in London.

== Publications ==
Several publications highlight his drawings:

- In 2006, publication of several drawings in the book 100 Years of Fashion Illustration Cally Blackman published in London
- In 2010, publication of several drawings in the book "Masters of Fashion Illustration" David Downton published in London.
- In 2014, publication of several drawings in the book "Bilder der mode" of Joëlle Chariau published in Munich.
