= Fashion illustration =

Two-dimensional fashion designing

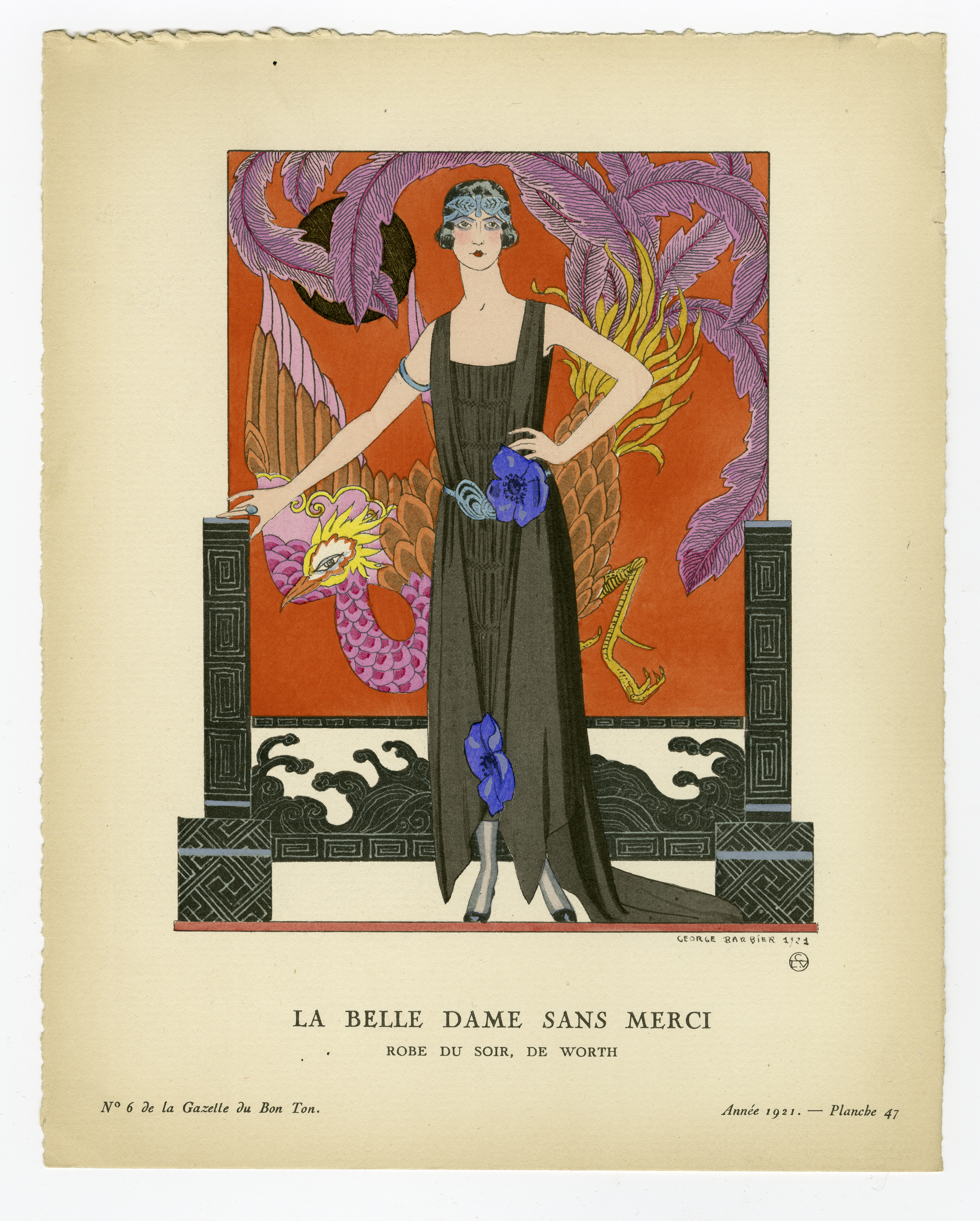
George Barbier fashion plate titled La Belle Dame sans Merci, plate 47, from Gazette du Bon Ton, 1921, issue 6

Fashion illustration is the art of communicating fashion ideas in a visual form through the use of drawing tools or design-based software programs. It is mainly used by fashion designers to brainstorm their ideas on paper or digitally. Fashion illustration plays a major role in design - it enables designers to preview garment ideas before they are converted to patterns and physically manufactured.

== History ==
Fashion illustration has been around for nearly 500 years. Ever since clothes have existed, there has been a need to translate an idea or image into a visual representation. Not only do fashion illustrations show a representation or design of a garment but they also serve as a form of art. The majority of fashion illustrations were created to be seen at a close range, often requiring the illustrator to have an eye for detail. Fashion illustration is said to be a visual luxury. In recent years, fashion illustration has seen a revival through social media platforms, where independent artists have gained visibility by sharing their work digitally. Fashion illustration saw a decline from the late 1930s when Vogue began to replace its celebrated illustrated covers with photographic images. This was a major turning point in the fashion industry. Laird Borrelli, author of Fashion Illustration Now states,

Fashion Illustration has gone from being one of the sole means of fashion communication to having a very minor role. The first photographic cover of Vogue was a watershed in the history of fashion illustration and a watershed mark of its decline. Photographs, no matter how altered or retouched, will always have some association with reality and by association truth. I like to think of them [fashion Illustrations] as prose poems and having more fictional narratives. They are more obviously filtered through an individual vision than photos. Illustration lives on, but in the position of a poor relative to the fashion.,

Fashion illustration differs from the fashion plate in that a fashion plate is a reproduction of an image, such as a drawing or photograph, for a magazine or book. Fashion illustrations can be made into fashion plate, but a fashion plate is not itself an original work of illustration.

In the modern day fashion illustrations are seen more as interpretations of garments rather than exact replicas. Illustrators have more freedom when working for themselves rather than for magazines, that valued realism over the illustrator's creative liberties.

== Process of Fashion Illustration ==
Designers use mediums such as gouache, marker, pastel, and ink to convey the details of garments and the feeling invoked by the artist. With the rise of digital art, some artists have begun to create illustrations using Adobe Photoshop or an application such as Procreate. There are two main purposes for fashion illustration: design communication and artistic expression. For design communication, artists frequently begin with a sketch of a figure called a croquis, and build a look on top of it. The artist takes care to render the fabrics and silhouettes used in the garment. They typically illustrate clothing on a figure with exaggerated 9-head proportions. The artist will typically find samples of fabric, or swatches, to imitate in their drawing. When illustrating for artistic expression, accurate proportion and faithful rendering of textiles take a back seat to dramatic usage of color and line to convey movement.

== Notable fashion illustrators ==
=== Notable active illustrators ===
- Caroline Andrieu
- Tina Berning
- Bil Donovan
- David Downton
- Connie Fleming
- Mats Gustafson
- Laura Laine
- Connie Lim
- Meagan Morrison
- Olena Saets
- Antonio Soares
- Julie Verhoeven

=== Notable illustrators of the past ===
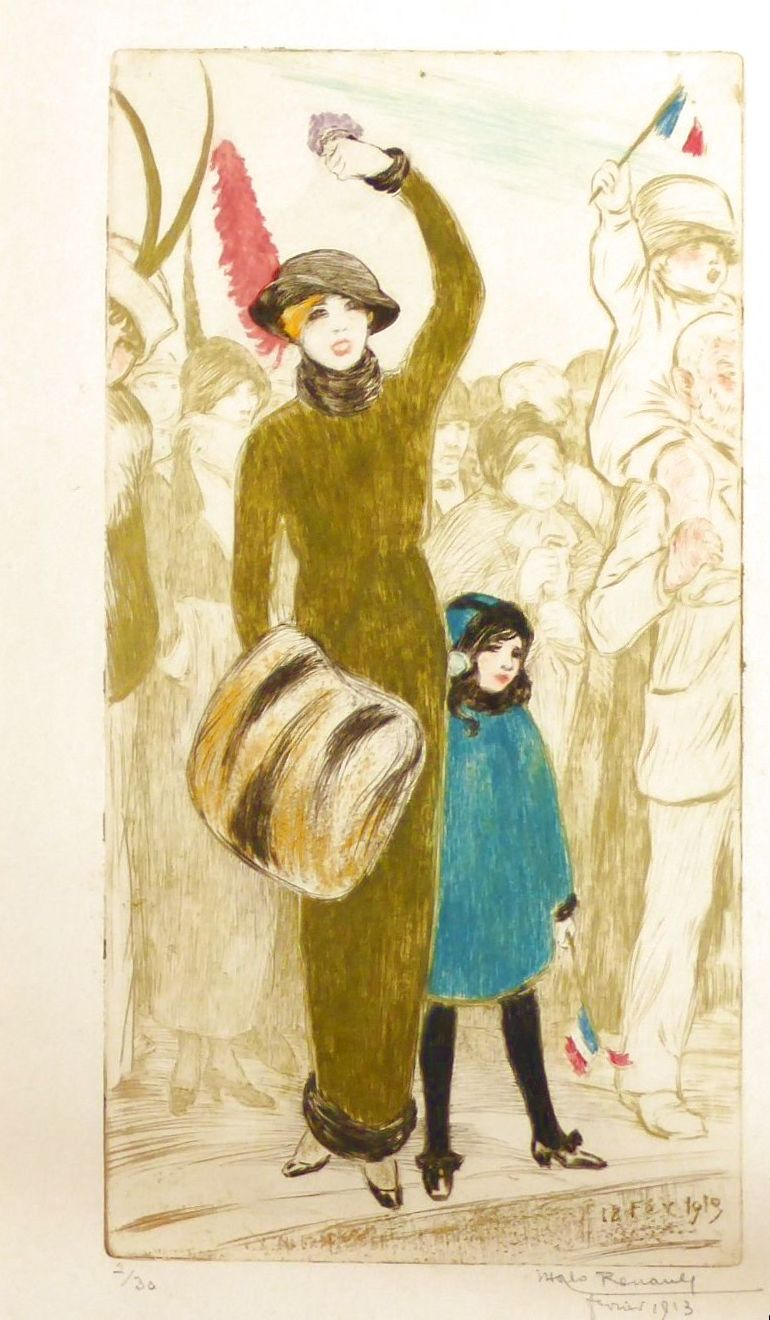
Figure de mode ou modes de Paris (Février 1913) by Malo-Renault

- Malo-Renault (1870–1938)
- George Barbier (1882–1932)
- Paul Iribe (1883–1935)
- Carl 'Eric' Erickson (1891–1958)
- 'Erté' Romain de Tirtoff (1892–1990)
- Christian Bérard (1902–1949)
- Max Hoff (1903–1985)
- Ruth Sigrid Grafstrom (1905–1986)
- Dagmar Freuchen (1907–1991)
- Rene Gruau (1909–2004)
- Irwin Crosthwait (1914–1981)
- Lila De Nobili (1916–2002)
- Bernard Blossac (1917–2002)
- Kenneth Paul Block (1924–2009)
- Andy Warhol (1928–1987)
- Antonio Lopez (1943–1987)
- Joel Resnicoff (1948–1986)
- Tony Viramontes (1956-1988)
