= Wynndel =

- Unincorporated community
- Location of Wynndel in British Columbia
- Coordinates: 49°10′47″N 116°33′09″W
- Country: Canada
- Province: British Columbia
- Region: Creston Valley, West Kootenay
- Regional district: Central Kootenay

Population
  - Total: 650
- Time zone: UTC-7 (MST)
- Postal codes: V0B 2N0, V0B 2N1, V0B 2N2
- Area codes: 250, 778, 236, & 672
- Highways: Highway 3A

Wynndel (/ˈwɪndəl/ WIN-dəl) is an unincorporated community adjacent to Duck Creek, east of the Kootenay River, in the West Kootenay region of southeastern British Columbia. The locality, on BC Highway 3A, is by road about 11 kilometres (7 mi) north of Creston and 128 kilometres (80 mi) southeast of Nelson.

== First Nations and European explorers ==
The Lower Kootenay Band of the Ktunaxa Nation have occupied the region from time immemorial. Tribal members would migrate north annually and set up camp on the Wynndel flats to harvest wild berries, hunt, and later graze cattle. While surveying the Dewdney Trail in 1865, the government expeditionary party crossed the Purcell Mountains via Duck Creek. The completed trail forded the Kootenay River about 5.5 kilometres (3.4 mi) west of today's Wynndel, travelled northeast and then southeast via present day Wynndel and Creston, before following the Goat River valley northeastward. By 1867, the Hudson's Bay Company (HBC) post of Little Fort Shepherd (Flatbow) had been established immediately south of Wynndel on the trail. This fort was abandoned around 1870.

== Name origin ==
A claim that Wynndel was named after one of the early fruit-growers in the district is disputed, because no evidence indicates such a person existed. A more suspect theory is the honoring of a NWMP officer named Wynn, but no officer by that name ever served with the force. Even more spurious claims have been suggested. As a surname the spelling is rare, whereas Wyndell as a given name is more common. The latter, an early alternate spelling for the community, is still sometimes mistakenly used. In earlier train timetables, the Canadian Pacific Railway (CP) opted for Wynndell, but a newspaper wrote Wyndell. For several years, the alternative spellings of Wynndel, Wyndel, Wyndell, and Wynndell remained in common usage. In pronunciation, locals emphasize the first syllable, whereas outsiders often prefer the second.

== Railways ==
During construction, the CP rail head passed northwestward toward Kuskonook in September 1898. The Wynndel vicinity was not a stop on the local service beginning that October or the Fort Macleod one beginning that December.

The building of the Bedlington & Nelson Railway (B&N), a Great Northern Railway subsidiary, faced opposition from CP. In July 1899, the Privy Council granted the B&N running rights on CP track northwestward from the Wynndel junction. Reaching Lizard Creek (a tributary to Duck Creek west of the CP track) that month, the B&N rail head faced an attempt by CP to obtain an injunction, claiming the work would damage an embankment supporting the CP track. Displeasure with the high-handed grading of the B&N across his mine claims prompted O.J. Wigen to briefly block the tracklaying in November. That December, the Supreme Court of British Columbia dismissed Wigen's injunction application, and the B&N assumed possession of the completed line from the main contractor. The route followed today's Lower Wynndel Rd (low road).

In July 1900, the B&N began limited services. That November, the daily service to Kuskonook via the junction began. Assumedly, the connecting junction stations opened at this time. In February 1901, the court awarded Wigen $350 in damages against the B&N. That August, B&N's operations north of the junction were suspended. Soon, there was little activity north of Creston. Certainly by February 1904, the three times weekly mixed train ran no farther north than Creston.

In early 1905, the respective junction stations were renamed Wilkes, probably after Fred Wilkes, a CP telegraph linesman from Fernie. The change to Wynndell a couple of years later, may have loosely derived from Wilkes or Wigen. Wynn is a runic letter in Old and Middle English representing the W sound and a dell is a valley.

In June 1913, on completion of the depot building, Duck Creek became a flag stop. In the new year, Duck Creek formally replaced Wynndel junction as the stop, and the unused station building was relocated to Duck Creek. The two places were 1.7 kilometres (1.1 mi) apart. The CP section crew was occasionally augmented by an extra gang. In 1915, CP installed a phone at the station and erected a new freight shed. In 1917, CP built a fish ladder at the Duck Creek culvert.

In 1920, an extra gang replaced the track through Duck Creek with heavier steel. During the next year, Duck Creek became a scheduled regular stop, the catcher pouch was removed, and the rail yard held parked railway cars from the district. In 1923, CP enlarged the siding capacity. The next year, a fire spread to the station, destroying the building. A boxcar provided temporary storage space until a larger building, which was mainly for freight storage, opened in 1925. In 1927, CP renamed Duck Creek as Wynndel and Wynndel siding as Loasby. Clarence McLean Loasby was a longtime yardmaster at Sirdar.

The stop was 10.3 kilometres (6.4 mi) northwest of Creston, and 9.7 kilometres (6.0 mi) southeast of Sirdar. Passenger service ended in 1964. The abandoned station was dismantled in the early 1980s.

GN Train Timetables (Regular stop or Flag stop)
Year	Mile	1901	1904	1905
Ref.				
Creston Jctn.	38.4	Reg	None	
Wilkes	38.4			None

CP Train Timetables (Regular stop or Flag stop)
Year	Mile	1903	1905	1909	1912	1914	1919	1929	1932	1935	1939	1943	1948	1953	1955	1960	1963
Ref.																	
Wilkes Jctn.	383	Flag															
Wilkes	384		Flag														
Wynndel	384			Flag	Flag												
Duck Creek	385.2					Flag	None										
Wynndel	385.2							Reg	Reg	Reg	Reg	Reg	Reg	Reg/Flag	Reg	Flag	Flag

== Rail accidents ==
1906: A train, which wrecked at a rock slide, fatally crushed a crew member. Months later, a train fatally struck a track walker.

1907: A brakeman died in a train accident.

1927: A freight train fatally dismembered an inebriated individual sleeping on the track.

1938: When a 13-car freight train derailed, two cars rolled down a 9-metre (30 ft) embankment and four cars lay zigzag across the track.

1941: A rockslide caused a locomotive, tender, and two cars to derail.

1946: A freight train struck the rear of a truck at a railway crossing, carrying the vehicle 6 metres (20 ft).

Trains fatally injuring straying livestock prompted CP to fence one side of the track in 1913. However, such livestock deaths continued.

== Agriculture ==
Settling in the mid-1890s, in 1900, O.J. Wigen marketed his surplus strawberries to customers at Cranbrook and launched Wynndel as a strawberry growing centre. The next year, he cleared land for the first orchard. By 1905, the exceptional quality of Wigen's commercially grown strawberries had become established. By 1909, his cultivation of over 1 hectare (3 acres) was very profitable. He became known as the strawberry king.

In 1913, the Co-Operative Fruit Growers of Wynndel was formed. That spring, nearly a thousand fruit trees were planted. One day that summer, 148 crates of strawberries were loaded onto the passenger train for expedited delivery. In 1915, the first full boxcar load of strawberries was shipped out, and the season total was 7,762 crates. In 1916, Wynndel withdrew from the Fruit Growers Union in the Creston Valley. The strawberry harvest was 11,018 crates, comprising nine carloads, in 1916, about 6,500 crates in 1918 and 9,000 in 1919. During the 1910s, attempts at tomato growing proved unviable. However, O.J. Wigen grew bumper potato crops.

In 1923, Elias Uri took over as manager of the fruit co-op from founder O.J. Wigen. After storm damage the next year, many orchards were not replanted. In 1926, a 400-ton capacity ice house and dedicated railway siding were installed. The next year, a 24 by 9 metres (78 by 30 ft) precooling plant opened, comprising three precooling rooms. The facility processed three loaded iced cars daily. By 1928, 40 hectares (100 acres) of strawberries were harvested annually.

In 1930, the first Wynndel fall fair was held. In 1932, 19,775 crates of strawberries and 2,000 of raspberries were shipped. The next year, the co-op erected a new warehouse. In 1934, work began on the Wynndel end of the dyking project, finishing about six months later. At Wynndel, one part was 6 metres (20 ft) high, and Duck Creek was diverted. Drainage pipes also handled irrigation. The dyke stretched to Creston. Also in 1935, the co-op precooling plant capacity was enlarged from four to seven carloads. The berry harvest comprised 26 carloads of strawberries, 1 of raspberries, 2 of cherries, and 2 of raspberry/cherry mix, a 25 per cent increase over the 1934 crop total.

During World War II, berry demand was high. About 15 tons of the 1939 crop went to the UK for making jam. In 1947, a large modern packing house was erected, with refrigeration capacity for 36,000 boxes of apples.

The larger poultry farms were Abbott 1946–1961 and Thompson 1945–1967. In 1967, a lightning bolt ignited straw that destroyed the two-storey building containing 4,000 birds and the granary.

In a period of expansion during the 1950s, growers produced a total of 1,500 tons of potatoes each season. In 1972, unable to survive financial losses, the fruit and potato packing plants closed.

The dyking of the flats triggered a gradual switch to grain crops, which later yielded better returns than the more perishable produce. The Midland and Pacific grain elevator, completed in 1937, ceased operations by the 1980s, and was demolished in 2013.

By the 1980s, only three commercial berry growers remained. Most of the orchards had disappeared.

== Lumber ==
In 1909, J.J. Grady sawmill established a sawmill. In May 1911, Murphy Bros. bought the 30,000-foot-daily capacity mill but resold to J.B. Winlaw in the fall. In 1914, the son of O.J. Wigen opened a mill, commonly called the Monrad Wigen sawmill and/or box factory. The next year, a large extension was added to the box factory building. During the spring high water, logs were towed to the bay and hauled by horses to the mill. In 1918, Wigen built a tramway to transport logs from the slough to the mill. Under construction since the prior year, the new Winlaw sawmill opened in 1919. That year, the Wynndel box factory (Monrad Wigen) made over 100,000 crates, and the mill boarding house opened.

In 1920, both mills ran at capacity, the Winlaw bunkhouse was extended, and Wigen installed an overhead sprinkler at his mill, which minimized damage during a fire months later. The Homeseeker's, Washum and Stokes, and the Russian were smaller mills briefly operating around this time. The daily capacities of the Winlaw and Wigen mills were 30,000 and 15,000 feet respectively. During spring, logs were floated down the Goat River to the Winlaw mill pond. In 1923, a Winlaw mill worker sustained a crushed foot in machinery, requiring an amputation below the knee. The next year, Monrad Wigen set up his portable sawmill at Lizard Creek, and three million feet of lumber burned in the Winlaw yard fire. The Winlaw office building, destroyed in a 1925 fire, was rebuilt the following year.

In 1927, fire destroyed four million feet of lumber in the Winlaw yard. The 1928 spring flooding submerged the Winlaw sawmill burner. In 1933, the Winlaw mill recommenced after a four-year shutdown. In 1934, the box factory reopened after a similar closure. In 1937, a fire completely destroyed the Winlaw sawmill plant and some lumber. Monrad Wigen bought this land, erected a new mill, and began operating the following year. In the early 1940s, a bandsaw replaced the circular saw. At that time, almost a hundred mills existed in the Kootenays. After the consolidations of the 1960s only three remained: Creston Sawmills, Wynndel Box, and Huscroft.

In 1947, Monrad Wigen erected a new mill, opening the next year. During the 1950s, the company installed a new planer, converted the sawmill and planer mill to electric power, installed a gangsaw, remodelled the sawmill, and added a progressive dry kiln. Jack and Bob, Monrad's sons, were involved in the business and assumed the management in 1971. In 1992, a new and larger gangsaw was installed. After 2000, a complete upgrade of the mill machinery was undertaken. In 2011, an outside CEO was appointed to restructure the boutique business. Employees number about 100. In 2014, Wynndel Box & Lumber adopted WynnWood as a trading name. In 2016, Canfor purchased the business.

== Early community ==
Around 1897, brothers Paul and Fred Hagen, and O.J. Wigen opened the 13-bedroom Duck Creek Hotel, which operated until 1910, when Paul and Mathea Hagen bought out the other partners. Apart from occasional boarders, the building was then purely the Hagen family residence until around 1940. The structure was sold in the mid-1940s, dismantled, erected on the flats, and destroyed by the 1948 flood. The earliest Caucasian births in the locality were in 1907, namely Beth Putnam and then Olga Hagen.

Edward Butterfield was the inaugural postmaster 1910–1931. In 1911, school commenced in a log bunkhouse. Officially recognized the next year, the building soon became overcrowded. In 1912, Winlaw provided a building for the social club on its formation. The building was called the club house. In 1913, a new schoolhouse was completed, and Edward Butterfield opened the first store about this time, described as a small seasonal general store. In 1915, Butterfield enlarged the building, bringing the store and post office under the same roof. By this time, dances were also held in the schoolhouse, and out of the harvest season, in the larger fruit packing sheds. At that time, news coverage adopted the name Wynndel for Duck Creek. The first year of local automobile ownership was 1917. In 1919, the clubhouse-packing shed received a concrete foundation, and Edward Butterfield's son Douglas entered into partnership to assume the store management.

In 1920, Butterfield & Son enlarged the store, and D.J. Dewar opened the Wynndel Mercantile. The Butterfield renovations continued into 1921, which included the addition of an ice cream parlor. That year, the Wynndel Co-Operative Trading Co. opened, the other two general stores were burgled, and a teacherage was erected. For the 1921/22 school year, an empty Winlaw bunkhouse provided temporary accommodation for an additional school classroom until a new two-room school building opened for the following year. The old schoolhouse continued to be used for social events. From 1922 or 1923, Jas. W. Wood operated the Wynndel Mercantile. In 1923, the co-op store doubled its retail space and erected an ice house to hold up to 50 tons of ice blocks cut locally. In 1924, the Butterfield store moved immediately west across the CP track, the co-op store closed, the Wynndel Mercantile acquired the inventory, the co-op building became warehouse storage, and an ice cream parlor was added to the store. Months later, a fire destroyed the Wynndel Mercantile store and contents, before crossing the lane to the station. The rebuilt store opened the following month.

In 1925, the St Paul's United church building opened and the new community hall the following year. In 1927, the Butterfield store experienced a series of robberies, and dancers welcomed the installation of a new floor in the old schoolhouse. In 1929, Butterfield installed a gas pump at the store, then known as the Bon Marche. In 1930, the Mercantile installed Shell gas pumps and transitioned to trading as the "Y"(our) Cash Store. That year, a new community hall was erected, the previous one probably becoming the annex. In 1931, electric lighting was installed. Edward Butterfield died that year, and the general store closed a year or two later.

In 1932, the former co-op store premises were renovated and the "Y" store, including ice cream parlor, relocated. E.S. Bailey headed the chain. In 1933, H. Cory replaced F. Menhinick as the Wynndel manager. Later that year, A. Corrie bought the Wynndel and Creston "Y" stores and traded as Corrie & Sons, and James Mitchell sold the auto repair garage to Fred Burrin and Eric Wood.

In 1934, A.W. Burch bought the Corrie store at Wynndel. The next year, the St Patrick's Anglican church building opened. In 1937, the one-room high school opened at the far end of the school grounds, but operated for just over a year, before pupils transferred to the new Creston Valley High School. In 1949, the building was moved closer to the school, and was called the senior room. By 1937, Jas Brown worked as a mechanic, and by 1939, the garage was called Speedway Motors, a partnership with Neil Swain. Since the pair had a history of acquiring garages, it is likely they had bought the Burrin and Wood business. In 1940, Otto Rollag purchased the garage, which relocated to the highway in 1953. This B.A. gas station had a number of owners over the following decades. The abandoned building has been empty since the late 1980s.

The Creston Co-op ran a Wynndel store 1947–1957. In 1948, a fire completely destroyed the community hall. The new building, opened in 1951, was the largest community hall in BC. An addition was installed on the side of the building in 1954. The St. Helen's Roman Catholic church building opened in 1948 and closed around 1964. The Church of God building held services 1952–1959. In 1961, a new two-room building was erected for grades 4–6, the old building housing grades 1–3. In 1962, the United church ceased regular services, but a Sunday school continued. Services resumed briefly 1964–1965. In 1964, the Anglican church was vandalized during a temporary closure. Anglican services recommenced, but ceased sometime after the mid-1980s. The Covenant church established a work in 1967, using the former United church building, which was purchased in 1976.

Ed. McNiven bought the Burch store, operating 1969–1972. In 1972, Terry Davidge opened the Farmer's Market, selling out to Al Jackson the next year, who developed Wynndel Foods on the site. This has remained the only general store. In 1971, the unused teacherage was demolished. Completed for the 1975/76 school year were three classrooms, an office, a library, and auditorium, which replaced the former facilities. In 1981, the Wynndel Fire Department opened the firehall.

The population, which was largely farmers, was about 125 by 1919, 150 by 1920, 325 by 1928, 396 by 1943, 550 by 1946, and 501 by 1951.

== Roads and utilities ==
In 1907, the Creston Power Light & Telephone Co (CPL&T) installed phone wires as far west as Duck Creek. Becoming operational in 1909, the line was extended 3 kilometres (2 mi). That year, the Creston–Duck Creek high road was built.

In 1912, the road was extended northwestward to Sirdar with a trail onward to Kuskanoook. In 1914, the Sirdar road work was finished.

During 1915, the government phone wires had been strung from Creston on the existing CPL&T poles and on new poles to Sirdar, creating a Nelson–Creston link. After increasing by one phone in 1918 and 1919, residential subscribers totalled five. The initial subscribers were likely the business enterprises.

From 1927, work on the Kuskanook–Gray Creek highway section continued. In summer 1931, this work was complete and the Fraser's Landing–Gray Creek Kootenay Lake Ferry auto route was inaugurated, improving the access to Nelson. Commencing that year, the Creston–Nelson Greyhound bus route followed the east shore. On at least one occasion, a Creston garage car ferried Greyhound passengers between Wynndel and Creston, because of adverse road conditions. Creston Bus Lines bought a new Hayes-Anderson coach in 1935, but the route details and period of operation are unclear. The parcel and freight delivery role of the Greyhound buses included the shipping of fresh fruit.

In 1933, Wynndel connected to the West Kootenay Power & Light (WKP&L) transmission lines from the Goat River Dam opening that year. The next year, the water supply system from the Wynndel Irrigation District dam on Duck Creek commenced operation. By 1935, electricity powered 90 per cent of residences.

In 1937, the low road from Creston was completed, but the district road conditions varied from poor to passable. Today's Highway 3A, the rebuilt high road south, opened as a gravel road in 1950, and reconstruction north to Kuskanook was completed in 1954, both being paved soon after construction. A later Creston Bus Lines provided a Creston–Wynndel service at least for 1947–1953. The October 1963 opening of the Salmo–Creston highway over the Kootenay Pass rerouted the Greyhound buses, bypassing Wynndel and the east shore.

By 1975, phone subscribers numbered 300, a significant increase over the eight in 1930.

BC Transit operates a twice weekly service.

== Freedomites ==
Various incidents linked to the Freedomites:
1953: Bombing of nearby CP tracks.
1958: Arson of a residence.
1961: Dynamiting of the grain elevator and an unexploded bomb at the Anglican church.
1962: Arson of a residence and public nudity.

== Later community ==
In 2019, suspects stole long guns in a break-in at Wynndel Foods, during an attempt to access the ATM inside. The elementary school closed in 2008. The community centre eventually purchased the property and installed a children's playground, which opened in 2021. Earlier that year high-speed internet came to Wynndel.

The economic base includes a major sawmill; a general store with gas pumps, a post office, fishing equipment, liquor and many other supplies; several small businesses servicing the local logging industry; and a number of home-based businesses ranging from bed and breakfasts, art galleries, wineries, distilleries, farms, orchards and tradesmen.

The Wynndel Memorial Hall and the Wynndel Community Church cater to gatherings. The Wynndel Lakeview Fire Department provides fire protection, and the Wynndel Irrigation District operates the water system.

The census population was 597 in 2016, 542 in 2011, and 597 in 2006.

== Notable people ==
- Frank Putnam (1881–1959), politician, was a resident c.1906–c.1911.
- Enoch Williams (1884–1970), union official and politician, was an intermittent Wynndel farmer from 1909, who later served as mayor of Blairmore, Alberta.

== Climate ==
Climate is similar to that of Creston.

== See also ==
- "1899 Kootenay map". www.library.ubc.ca. p. 1. for surrounding communities.
- "1925 BC map". www.davidrumsey.com. for specific communities.
