= School District 8 Kootenay Lake =

School district in British Columbia, Canada

- Logo of School District 8 Kootenay Lake

Location
- Nelson Creston, Crawford Bay, Kaslo, Slocan Valley, Nelson, Salmo Canada

District information
- Superintendent: Trish Smillie
- Schools: 23
- Budget: CA$81 million

Students and staff
- Students: 4,800

Other information
- Website: www.sd8.bc.ca

School District No. 8 (Kootenay Lake) is a school district in British Columbia. The district includes the municipalities of Nelson, Creston, Kaslo and Slocan, British Columbia, as well as many rural communities in the Regional District of Central Kootenay.

== History ==
School District No. 8 (Kootenay Lake) was created in 1996 when the Province of B.C.'s then-Ministry of Education, Skills and Training reduced the number of school districts from 75 to 57 (now 60), largely to save money by restructuring. School District No. 86 (Creston-Kaslo) and School District No. 7 (Nelson) were amalgamated to create what is now commonly referred to as SD8.

In 2016, the district board of education considered closing Creston Education Centre, Jewett Elementary School, Salmo Elementary School, Trafalgar Middle School, Winlaw Elementary School, and Yahk Elementary School. The board of education voted to keep Jewett and Winlaw elementary schools open. Salmo Elementary and Trafalgar Middle School also remained open.

== Schools ==
| School | Location | Grades |
|---|---|---|
| Winlaw Elementary School | Winlaw | K–6 |
| W.E. Graham Community School | Slocan | K–10 |
| Trafalgar Middle School | Nelson | 7–9 |
| South Nelson Elementary School | Nelson | K–6 |
| Salmo Secondary School | Salmo | 7–12 |
| Salmo Elementary School | Salmo | K–6 |
| Rosemont Elementary School | Nelson | K–5 |
| Redfish Elementary School | Balfour | K–6 |
| Kootenay River Secondary School | Creston | 8–12 |
| Mount Sentinel Secondary School | South Slocan | 7–12 |
| Adam Robertson Elementary School | Creston | K–7 |
| L V Rogers Secondary School | Nelson | 9–12 |
| Blewett Elementary School | Blewett | K–6 |
| Brent Kennedy Elementary School | South Slocan | K–6 |
| Crawford Bay Elem-Secondary School | Crawford Bay | K–12 |
| Canyon-Lister Elementary School | Canyon | K–7 |
| ELEV8 Provincial Online Learning School | Nelson | K–12 |
| Erickson Elementary School | Erickson | K–7 |
| Jewett Elementary School | Kaslo | K–7 |
| J V Humphries Elem-Secondary School | Kaslo | K–12 |
| Hume Elementary School | Nelson | K–6 |
| Homelinks Online School | Creston | K–12 |

== See also ==
- List of school districts in British Columbia
