= David Crosthwait =

African-American mechanical and electrical engineer, inventor, and writer

- Born: David Nelson Crosthwait Jr. May 27, 1892; Nashville, Tennessee
- Died: February 25, 1976 (aged 83); Michigan City, Indiana
- Education: Purdue University
- Engineering career
- Discipline: Electrical, Mechanical
- Employer: C.A. Dunham Company (now Marshall Engineered Products Company)
- Projects: Radio City Music Hall (Heating system)
- Awards: Honorary Doctorate (Purdue University)

David Nelson Crosthwait Jr. (May 27, 1892 – February 25, 1976) was an African-American mechanical and electrical engineer, inventor, and writer. Crosthwait's expertise was on air ventilation, central air conditioning, and heat transfer systems. He was responsible for creating heating systems for larger buildings such as Rockefeller Center and New York's Radio City Music Hall. He was granted an honorary doctoral degree in 1975 from Purdue University. In 1971, Crosthwait was elected as a fellow of the American Society of Heating, Refrigerating and Air-Conditioning Engineers (ASHRAE), making him the first African American fellow. Crosthwait was also named a fellow of the American Association for the Advancement of Science (AAAS).

== Life and career ==
David Nelson Crosthwait Jr. was born in the city of Nashville, Tennessee. He grew up in Kansas City, Missouri. He completed high school and received a Bachelor of Science (1913) and a Masters of Engineering (1920) from Purdue University.

Crosthwait's expertise was on air ventilation, central air conditioning, and heat transfer systems. With this knowledge he created many different heating systems, refrigeration methods, temperature regulating devices, and vacuum pumps. For these inventions he holds 39 United States patents, as well as 80 international patents. In the 1920s and 1930s Crosthwait invented a vacuum pump, a boiler, and a thermostat control, all for more effective heating systems for larger buildings. Some of his greatest accomplishments were for creating the heating systems for the Rockefeller Center and New York's Radio City Music Hall.

He later wrote and revised an instruction manual and guides for heating and cooling with water and guides, standards, and codes that dealt with heating, air conditioning, and ventilation systems.

== Later life ==
After retiring from the field in 1971, Crosthwait taught a course on steam heating theory and control systems at Purdue University. He was awarded an honorary doctorate from Purdue University in 1975, and died one year later in 1976.
