= Goat River (Kootenay River tributary) =

River in British Columbia, Canada

Coordinates: 49°05′45.2″N 116°27′7.7″W

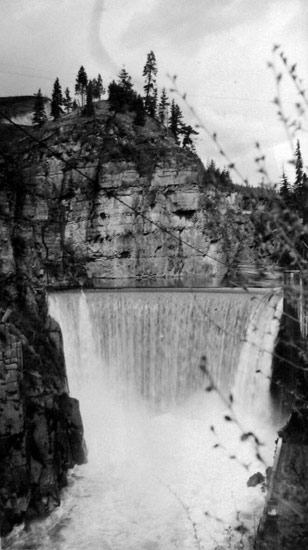
Goat River Dam in 1935

The Goat River is a tributary of the Kootenay River in the Canadian province of British Columbia. The river meets the Kootenay near the town of Creston. The Goat River Dam, constructed in the 1930s, was an early source of electricity for the town. Before dikes were built, the river was a major source of spring flooding in the Creston valley.

== Course ==
85 kilometres (53 mi) in length, the Goat River rises in the central Purcell Mountains just west of Mallaindane Pass and flows largely south until meeting Kitchener Creek. From this confluence, it bends southwest towards the towns of Erickson and Creston. Its lower reaches are the route of the southern mainline of the Canadian Pacific Railway and the Crowsnest Highway. The total area of the Goat River drainage is approximately 69,200 hectares (171,000 acres).

== History ==
In the 1860s, the lower Goat River valley became part of the route for the Dewdney Trail, connecting the gold fields of Wild Horse Creek with the coast. Surveyed and constructed by Edgar Dewdney and Walter Moberly, the trail was seen as a countermeasure to American encroachment into the southern Kootenays.

The demand for electricity in the growing town of Creston led to the construction of the Goat River Dam in the early 1930s. The 20 metres (66 ft) concrete arch dam is located five kilometers east of Creston. It operated until the large power projects of the 1950s in the Kootenays reduced the need for the generating station, which suffered from ice buildup in winter and an inconstant water supply. It was decommissioned and sold in 1979.

== See also ==
- List of rivers of British Columbia
