= Creston Aerodrome =

- IATA: CFQ; ICAO: none; TC LID: CAJ3

Summary
- Airport type: Public
- Operator: Creston Valley Regional Airport Society
- Location: Creston, British Columbia
- Time zone: MST (UTC−07:00)
- Elevation AMSL: 2,094 ft / 638 m
- Coordinates: 49°02′12″N 116°29′53″W

Map
- Location in British Columbia

Runways
Direction	Length		Surface
Direction	ft	m	Surface
15/33	3,944	1,202	Asphalt
- Source: Canada Flight Supplement

Creston Aerodrome (IATA: CFQ, TC LID: CAJ3) is located 3.5 nautical miles (6.5 km; 4.0 mi) south southeast of Creston, British Columbia, Canada. The airport is more commonly known now as the Creston Valley Regional Airport or its former name of the Art Sutcliffe Field.

== History ==
In 1919, Lieutenant Ernest O. Hall made an emergency landing on an uneven field near the Canyon City Lumber mill. After refilling the tanks with contaminated fuel, the plane crashed on takeoff, damaging a car and wrecking the aircraft.

An airstrip has existed at least since the 1930s.

In late 1978, the community received a $100,000 grant toward an airport, enabling the development of one of the finest airstrips in the region.

In 2011, several all-season, all-weather hangars were built primarily for the active flying club, and a new emergency services building was erected for the medivac.
