= Irwin Crosthwait =

- Born: Irwin Crosthwait; June 24, 1914; Creston, British Columbia
- Died: September 15, 1981 (aged 67); Montreal, Quebec, Canada
- Known for: Painting

Irwin Crosthwait (June 24, 1914 – September 15, 1981), was a Canadian painter best known for his role as a fashion illustrator.

== Biography ==
=== Early life and education ===
Irwin "Bud" Crosthwait was born on June 24, 1914, in Creston, British Columbia, the son of Lealand Crosthwait (1870-1944) and Ellen Johnson Crosthwait (1892-1944), owners of a farm in Creston.

Throughout Irwin’s childhood, he was exposed to the artwork of his father. Henry Crosthwait, a native of New Zealand, worked for the Peninsular and Oriental Steam Navigation Company prior to arriving in Canada and had sketched and painted his travels aboard the company’s ships.

Following the separation of Irwin Crosthwait’s parents in 1928, Irwin and his brother, Tom, moved to Montreal and lived under the care of their uncle. Between the years of 1934 and 1938, Crosthwait was educated at Sir George Williams College in Montreal, where he studied Fine Arts, and the Pratt Institute in New York City. After completing his studies, Crosthwait returned to Montreal and spent several years mentoring under Herman Heimlick, a local artist.

=== Career ===
Crosthwait continued producing artwork while employed as the principal advertising artist for Henry Morgan & Company, a chain of Canadian department stores. In 1944, Irwin was awarded the Jessie Dow prize for his watercolor painting and later enlisted with the Royal Canadian Navy. While aboard HMCS Ontario and HMCS Warrior in the years of 1945 and 1946, he served as an official naval artist, painting the ships and their sailors.

In August 1947, Crosthwait accompanied HMCS Warrior to the United Kingdom, where he was granted his discharge from the Royal Canadian Navy. Crosthwait relocated to Paris in September of that year and began his career as a fashion illustrator. He sketched and illustrated collections belonging to designers such as Yves Saint Laurent, Dior, and Givenchy, as well as those of his personal friends Emilio Pucci and Marc Vaughan. In the subsequent years, Crosthwait’s fashion illustrations were predominantly featured in Harper’s Bazaar.

During his years in Paris, Crosthwait also worked on sets for the Paris Ballet and pursued other means of artistic expression, most notably abstract painting. Crosthwait’s abstracts were shown with contemporary artists that included Serge Poliakoff, Hans Hartung, and Nicolas de Staël.

=== Death ===
In 1979, Irwin Crosthwait suffered a serious injury resulting from a fall in London. He later died in Montreal on September 15, 1981, at the age of 67.

== Sources ==
- Biography from the Irwin Crosthwait official website
