= Creston, British Columbia =

Creston
- Town
- Town of Creston
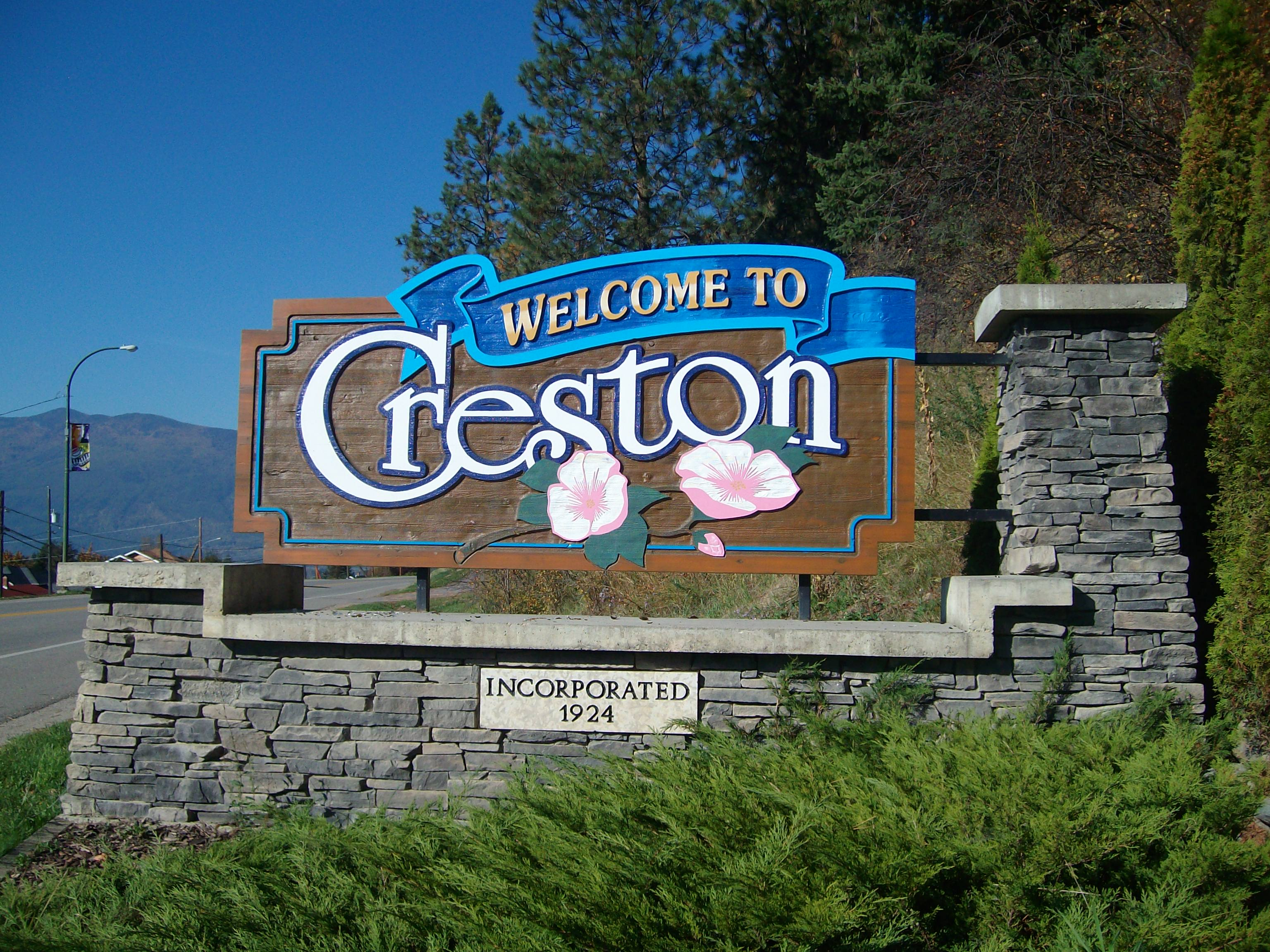
- Creston's eastern town limit welcome sign on Highway 3.

- Location within British Columbia
- Coordinates: 49°05′51″N 116°30′36″W
- Country: Canada
- Province: British Columbia
- Region: Kootenays
- Regional district: Central Kootenay
- Incorporated: 1924
- Named for: Creston, Iowa

Government
  - Mayor: Denise Dumas
  - Town of Creston Council: Councillors: Tanya Wall; Ferd Schmidt; Carolyn Hawton; Megan Holland; Judy Germann; Norm Eisler
  - MP: Rob Morrison (CPC)
  - MLA: Brittny Anderson (BCNDP)

Area
  - Total: 8.47 km^{2} (3.27 sq mi)
- Elevation: 597 m (1,959 ft)

Population (2021)
  - Total: 5,583
  - Density: 663.9/km^{2} (1,719/sq mi)
- Time zone: UTC−07:00 (MST)
- Postal code span: V0B 1G0 & V0B 3G0
- Area codes: 250, 778, 236, & 672
- Highways: Highway 3 Highway 3A; Highway 21
- Waterways: Kootenay River
- Website: www.creston.ca

Creston is a town in the Kootenay region of southeastern British Columbia, Canada.

== Time zones ==
British Columbia is among the areas of Canada that do not observe daylight saving time, and settlements on the east shore of Kootenay Lake and along BC Highway 3 from Creston to Yahk remain on Mountain Standard Time year-round.

== Geography ==
By road, Creston is roughly equidistant between Cranbrook (105 km (65 mi) to the east), Castlegar (124 km (77 mi) to the west) along the Crowsnest Highway, and Nelson (123 km (76 mi) to the north-northwest). Creston is approximately 12 km (7.5 mi) north of the Porthill-Rykerts Border Crossing on the Canada–US border. Defining Creston's place as being within either the east or West Kootenays can be contentious, as some locals regard it as being in a transition space between them.

=== East Kootenay ===
The 1860 survey defined the Purcell Mountains as the east–west divide, which geographically places Creston in East Kootenay, but conversely the nearby community of Crawford Bay in West Kootenay. Prior to the opening of the highway over the Kootenay Pass from Salmo in 1963, allowing westward travel, Creston had tended to develop cultural links eastward via the only major highway of the time. Minor sports groups and teams, such as in hockey and baseball, belonged to East Kootenay leagues.

=== West Kootenay ===
An 1899 advertisement described the Creston Townsite Co. as West Kootenay Valley. Since the highest passes of the Purcells are north-northeast, Creston might be considered in the west of them.

=== Central Kootenay ===
The Creston Review, first published in 1908, took a neutral stance on which Kootenay descriptor applied best. However, for several years, a front-page banner stated: "All roads in East Kootenay and West Kootenay lead to Creston." Prior to the creation of the Regional District of Central Kootenay in 1965, Central Kootenay did not exist as a geographic concept. The RDCK is centred in Nelson.

== History ==
The Lower Kootenay Band of the Ktunaxa Nation has occupied the region from time immemorial. Members would paddle their canoes across the flooded flats to harvest wild rice, one of the staples of their diet. The people called the Creston area Yaqan Nukiy, meaning "where the rock stands". The Kutenai language is noted for its uniqueness, as were the distinctive sturgeon-nosed canoes. Members reside in several local reserves. As of 2020, the Lower Kootenay Band is in Stage 4 of the British Columbia Treaty Process.

Europeans referred to this area as the Goat River district. Established in 1865, the section of the Dewdney Trail travelled southeast via present-day Wynndel and Creston, before following the Goat River valley northeastward. On an 1882 hunting trip, William A. Baillie-Grohman and Theodore Roosevelt camped in the vicinity of today's Creston. Baillie-Grohman noted the agricultural potential of the flats if protected from flooding.

== Name origin ==
In 1891, three settlers obtained 65-hectare (160-acre) lots. Of today's town, John Wilson Dow owned the northern portion, Fred. G. Little, the centre, and John Arrowsmith, the southwestern corner. The Columbia and Kootenay Steam Navigation Company's twice-weekly sailings between Nelson and Bonners Ferry served the growing community on the edge of the flats.

The place was formerly known as Fred Little's Ranch and then as the Eighth Siding during the construction of the Canadian Pacific Railway. The name of Fisher was chosen for the initial timetable published in August 1898, assumedly after Sydney Arthur Fisher, a politician friendly to the railway.

Some confusion existed as to whether a rename to Sirdar would be adopted. Sirdar was the rank assigned to the commander-in-chief of the British-controlled Egyptian Army in the late 19th to early 20th centuries. Lord Kitchener, who had held this position, was equally honoured by the CP station of Kitchener 19 km (12 mi) northeast. Sirdar, an existing CP station 24 km (15 mi) northwest, would also have needed to be renamed in such circumstances.

Residents preferred the name Creston, which appears to have been in popular use. Fred Little selected the name after Creston, Iowa, where he had worked for the Chicago, Burlington and Quincy Railroad, which also stood at the outlet of a major water body. The residents petitioned CP to change the name from Fisher to Creston, a request CP granted before late 1899.

== Railways ==
CP accepted offers from Little and Dow for a half-interest in their properties. During construction, the CP rail head passed northwestward toward Kuskonook in September 1898. Although construction trains offered passenger service until mid-October, the line was not handed over to CP until mid-November, but services on the western section did not resume until mid-December. The two-storey station was erected that year.

In December 1899, the Bedlington & Nelson Railway (B&N), a Great Northern Railway subsidiary, assumed possession of the completed line from the main contractor. The route followed today's Lower Wynndel Rd (low road). In July 1900, the B&N began limited services and that November, a daily service to Kuskonook. That August, B&N's operations north of the junction (Wynndel) were suspended. Soon, there was little activity north of Creston. Certainly by February 1904, the three times weekly mixed train ran no farther north than Creston. In December 1914, the final twice weekly mixed train ran north to Creston, and the Wynndel–Porthill track was lifted in 1916.

In 1949, CP replaced the former station with a single level flat-roofed one. Passenger service on the route ended in 1964. In 1982, the station closed. In 1990, track removal left only one siding, and the brewery spur.

== Early community ==
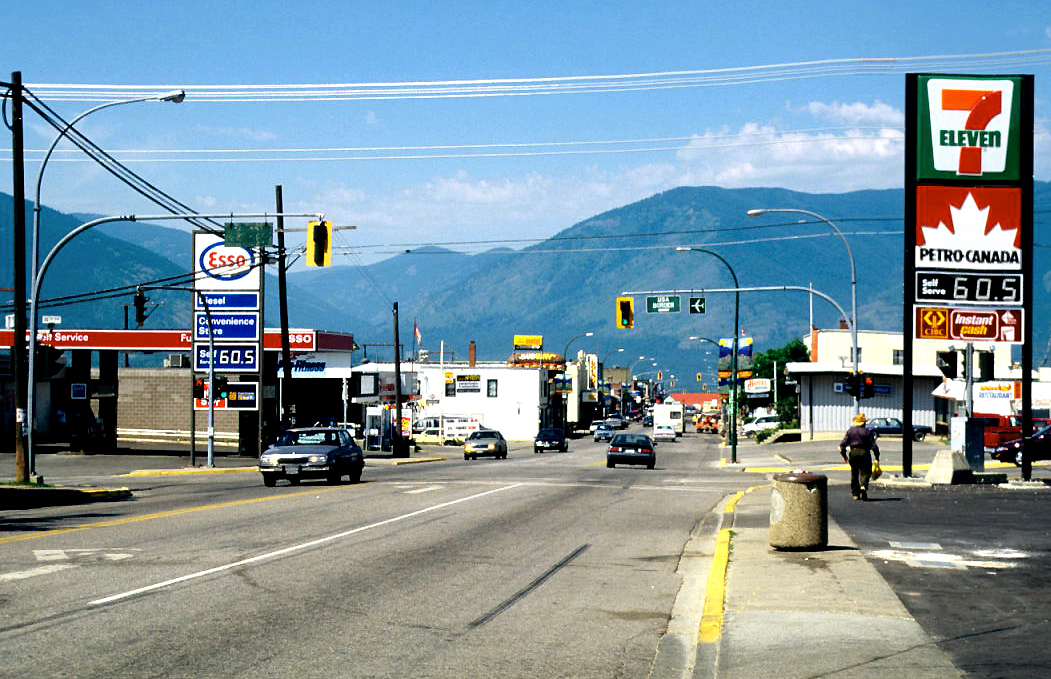
Creston in 1996.

Little and the CP created separate subdivisions, which sold quickly. In late 1898, Robt. J. Long built the first hotel. By 1900, a settlement was growing around Long's Creston and John Munroe's Queen's hotels on the portion of Little's subdivision below the tracks. To meet demand, Little further subdivided above the tracks, to where William Crawford and Charles Faas moved their general stores, now the downtown. In 1907, the Imperial Groceteria and the Canadian Bank of Commerce branch opened. The next year, The Creston Review began publication. Creston was incorporated as a village in 1924. The next year, exchanges of gunfire occurred during a bank robbery. One outlaw was captured the following afternoon. His unidentified partner disappeared with $4,000. In 1930, Dr. Olivier opened an eleven-bed hospital, and the Creston Hotel (1898) burned to the ground. In 1949, the Kootenay Hotel opened. In 1960, Interior Breweries began production at a new brewery. Creston was incorporated as a town in 1966. In 1974, the Labatt Brewing Company acquired 84 per cent of Columbia Brewing Company (the 1972 rename of Interior Breweries).

== Agriculture ==
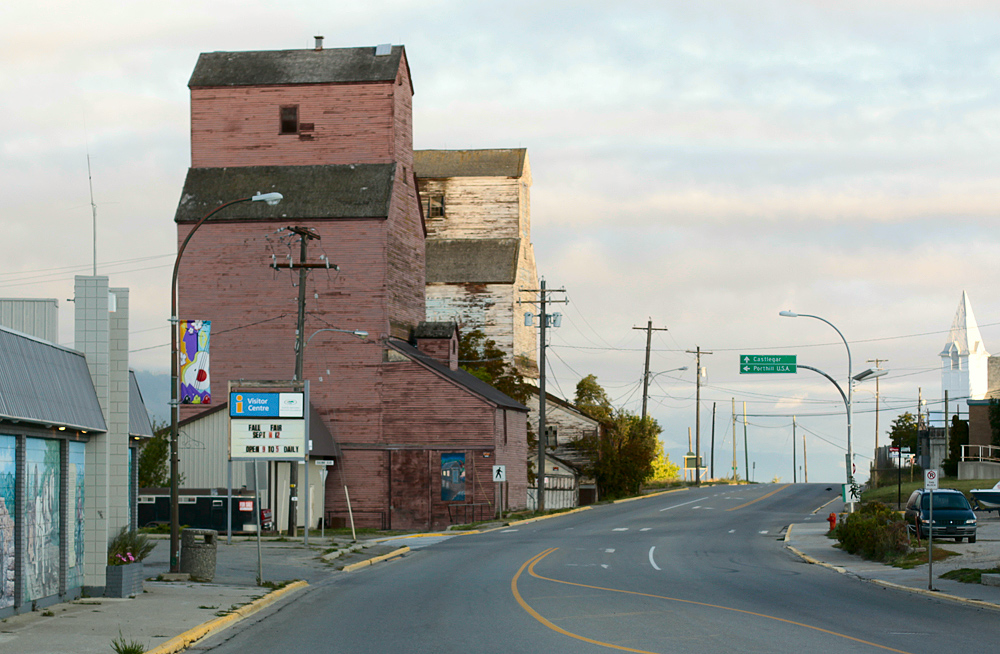
Grain Elevators in Creston, 2009.

About 1884, likely associated with the Baillie-Grohman reclamation plan, the first settlers arrived, cleared the slopes around today's Creston, and planted orchards, but obtained no preemptions. In the early 1890s, William Rodger and Jane Huscroft, with their large family and cattle, squatted on the flats. During 1893, crews dyked the river, but the exceptional flooding during the following spring destroyed much of the work. In partnership with the Kootenay Valley Power and Development Co., settlers completed reconstruction that year, reclaiming 3,100 ha (7,700 acres). Later deterioration of the dykes resumed annual flooding, leaving the land suitable only for hay harvests.

Apple and cherry orchards were well established by the 1920s. As returning World War I veterans developed farms on the flat lands to the south, grain harvests increased. Grain elevators were built in Creston by the Midland Pacific Grain Corporation in 1935 and the Alberta Wheat Pool in 1936 and 1949. Rebuilt dyking of a few years earlier succumbed to floods in 1938 and 1948. The first annual Blossom Festival was held in 1942. In 2018, the Columbia Basin Trust acquired the two remaining abandoned elevators (1935 and 1936) with a view to restoration.

== Lumber ==
Small sawmills were established in 1898 and around 1903. In 1907, C.O. Rodgers erected a mill at the mouth of the Goat River gorge. In partnership with D.W. Briggs, he reorganized as the Canyon City Lumber Co. in 1911. After a 1923 fire destroyed the mill, the rebuild, known as Creston Sawmills, opened in 1924. The specialized Rodgers Box Factory catered to the fruit and berry trade. The sawmill closed in 1981 and the buildings were torn down. The veneer and planer mills, which closed a decade later, were also demolished.

== Road/air transportation ==
By 1909, the highway to Cranbrook was rated as good. By 1910, a passable trail existed east to Lethbridge, which by 1912 was a main road. After realignments, a proper gravel highway opened in 1920. In 1932, the route became the No. 3, Interprovincial Highway, remaining for years the main road connection between the two western provinces.

Southward, a wagon road existed by the 1890s, which was periodically upgraded over the following decades.

In 1931, the ferry/highway auto route north to Nelson was inaugurated.

When Canyon St. was widened in 1947 for the new Crowsnest Highway, the frontage buildings were moved 3.0 m (10 ft) back.

The October 1963 opening of the Salmo–Creston highway rerouted most traffic from the ferry route.

Creston is served by the Creston Valley Airport formerly known as the Art Sutcliffe Field. In 2017, the pilot of a small plane safely made an emergency landing on Highway 3 west of Creston.

Prior to Greyhound Canada ceasing all intraprovincial services in 2018, an application the prior year included a service reduction via Creston. The summer bus service between Kaslo and Calgary, instituted by a regional operator in 2019, included a Creston stop.

In 2021, the Creston Valley Transit System replaced its fleet of diesel-powered buses with four light-duty, gasoline-driven buses.

Census population: Creston
Year	Pop.	±%
1941	1,153	—
1951	1,626	+41.0%
1956	1,844	+13.4%
1961	2,460	+33.4%
1966	2,920	+18.7%
1971	3,204	+9.7%
1976	3,562	+11.2%
1981	4,190	+17.6%
1986	4,098	−2.2%
1991	4,205	+2.6%
1996	4,207	+0.0%
2001	4,795	+14.0%
2006	4,826	+0.6%
2011	5,306	+9.9%
2016	5,351	+0.8%
2021	5,583	+4.3%
Source: Statistics Canada

== Communications and utilities ==
In 1907, the Creston Power Light & Telephone Co (CPL&T) installed phone wires northwest to Duck Creek, east to Erickson, and south to Porthill, Idaho. The next year, the Goat Mountain Waterworks replaced transporting water by wagon from Wynndel.

The excess from electricity generation by the sawmill was sold to the Creston Power, Light and Telephone Company. In 1934, West Kootenay Power & Light (WKP&L) replaced the mill supply, using transmission lines from the Goat River Dam.

In 2015, Telus completed a project to string fibre optic cables for residential and business use.

A $1.1M upgrade in 2017 to the undersized Schikurski Pump Station secured the town water supply.

== Later community ==
Creston offers an infrastructure typical of a town of this size, including brewery tours, a shopping mall, golf course and a large selection of motels, hotels, and three campsites. In 2011, the Creston & District Community Complex (1971) received new flooring and upgraded amenities.

The Creston-based Kokanee Beer movie entry won a Gold Lion at the 2013 Cannes Lions International Festival of Creativity. That year, Budweiser production began at the Columbia Brewery.

The Art Deco style Tivoli Theatre (1938) and many of these 1930-ish wood-framed structures in the downtown area seek to mimic this architectural style. After a 2015 fire extensively damaged Trinity United Church, reconstruction work did not start until two years later.

== Media ==
The Creston Valley is served by AM radio station CFKC-AM at 1340 kHz (rebroadcasting CJAT-FM Trail, BC), and by FM radio stations CKCV-FM at 94.1 MHz, and CBTS-FM at 100.3 MHz (rebroadcasting CBTK-FM Kelowna, BC as part of the CBC Radio One network). Previous to CBTS-FM's debut, CBRM was a low-power AM station rebroadcasting CBU Vancouver that was discontinued when CBTS-FM took to the air. The broadcast antennae of CKCV-FM and CBTS-FM are co-located at 49°09′52.5″N 116°40′53.7″W to the West-northwest of Creston. CIDO-FM formerly broadcast at 97.7 MHz but went dormant in 2016 and its license expired. The local newspaper is the Creston Valley Advance.

== Demographics ==
In the 2021 Census of Population conducted by Statistics Canada, Creston had a population of 5,583 living in 2,670 of its 2,810 total private dwellings, a change of 4.1% from its 2016 population of 5,361. With a land area of 8.41 km^{2} (3.25 sq mi), it had a population density of 663.9/km^{2} (1,719.4/sq mi) in 2021.

=== Ethnicity ===
Panethnic groups in the Town of Creston (2001−2021)
Panethnic group	2021		2016		2011		2006		2001	
Panethnic group	Pop.	%	Pop.	%	Pop.	%	Pop.	%	Pop.	%
European (Note: Statistic includes all persons that did not make up part of a visible minority or an indigenous identity.)	4,705	87.62%	4,705	92.16%	4,795	94.58%	4,445	94.98%	4,480	95.93%
Indigenous	425	7.91%	310	6.07%	210	4.14%	160	3.42%	155	3.32%
South Asian	80	1.49%	15	0.29%	0	0%	30	0.64%	0	0%
East Asian (Note: Statistic includes total responses of "Chinese", "Korean", and "Japanese" under visible minority section on census.)	70	1.3%	10	0.2%	0	0%	20	0.43%	20	0.43%
Southeast Asian (Note: Statistic includes total responses of "Filipino" and "Southeast Asian" under visible minority section on census.)	25	0.47%	55	1.08%	10	0.2%	10	0.21%	0	0%
Latin American	40	0.74%	10	0.2%	0	0%	10	0.21%	10	0.21%
African	20	0.37%	0	0%	0	0%	10	0.21%	10	0.21%
Middle Eastern (Note: Statistic includes total responses of "West Asian" and "Arab" under visible minority section on census.)	0	0%	0	0%	0	0%	0	0%	0	0%
Other/multiracial (Note: Statistic includes total responses of "Visible minority, n.i.e." and "Multiple visible minorities" under visible minority section on census.)	0	0%	0	0%	0	0%	0	0%	0	0%
Total responses	5,370	96.18%	5,105	95.22%	5,070	95.55%	4,680	96.97%	4,670	97.39%
Total population	5,583	100%	5,361	100%	5,306	100%	4,826	100%	4,795	100%
Note: Totals greater than 100% due to multiple origin responses.

=== Religion ===
According to the 2021 census, religious groups in Creston included:

- Irreligion (2,675 persons or 49.8%)
- Christianity (2,525 persons or 47.0%)
- Hinduism (35 persons or 0.7%)
- Buddhism (25 persons or 0.5%)
- Judaism (15 persons or 0.3%)
- Sikhism (10 persons or 0.2%)
- Other (75 persons or 1.4%)

== Climate ==
Creston has either an inland oceanic climate (Köppen - Cfb) or a humid continental climate (Dfb), depending on the isotherm used (0 or −3 °C (32 or 27 °F)), though rainfall patterns are such that it just barely avoids being classified as a Mediterranean climate (Csb or Dsb). Creston's climate is often modified by air masses of the Pacific Ocean origin, especially in winter. Daily maximum temperatures are usually above freezing even in January except when air masses of Arctic origin move over the area. The worst cold outbreaks may send temperatures below −30 °C (−22 °F) on rare occasions. Spring comes early by Canadian standards; trees usually start to leaf out before the end of April. A clear summer day is likely to have a mean daily maximum near or above 28 °C (82 °F); the record maximum is 41.4 °C (106.5 °F). The last spring frost typically occurs by April 22, and frost usually holds off until around October 18 where air drainage is good.

The mean annual precipitation is 689.0 mm (27.13 in) in mid-town, but the area has a rather steep precipitation gradient which is reflected in regional ecosystems.

Climate data for Creston Climate ID: 1142160; coordinates 49°05′49″N 116°31′04″W; elevation: 610.4 m (2,003 ft); 1991–2020 normals, extremes 1912–present
Month	Jan	Feb	Mar	Apr	May	Jun	Jul	Aug	Sep	Oct	Nov	Dec	Year
Record high °C (°F)	12.2 (54.0)	14.0 (57.2)	24.0 (75.2)	30.0 (86.0)	36.7 (98.1)	41.4 (106.5)	39.4 (102.9)	38.7 (101.7)	35.6 (96.1)	27.0 (80.6)	17.8 (64.0)	13.3 (55.9)	41.4 (106.5)
Mean daily maximum °C (°F)	1.3 (34.3)	3.5 (38.3)	8.6 (47.5)	14.1 (57.4)	20.0 (68.0)	22.8 (73.0)	28.6 (83.5)	28.1 (82.6)	21.7 (71.1)	12.9 (55.2)	5.1 (41.2)	0.6 (33.1)	13.9 (57.1)
Daily mean °C (°F)	−1.4 (29.5)	0.1 (32.2)	4.1 (39.4)	8.6 (47.5)	13.6 (56.5)	16.7 (62.1)	21.3 (70.3)	20.9 (69.6)	15.4 (59.7)	8.1 (46.6)	2.2 (36.0)	−1.8 (28.8)	9.0 (48.2)
Mean daily minimum °C (°F)	−4.0 (24.8)	−3.5 (25.7)	−0.4 (31.3)	3.0 (37.4)	7.3 (45.1)	10.6 (51.1)	14.0 (57.2)	13.6 (56.5)	9.0 (48.2)	3.4 (38.1)	−0.6 (30.9)	−4.1 (24.6)	4.0 (39.2)
Record low °C (°F)	−32.8 (−27.0)	−31.1 (−24.0)	−21.7 (−7.1)	−15.0 (5.0)	−6.7 (19.9)	−1.7 (28.9)	1.7 (35.1)	−0.6 (30.9)	−7.2 (19.0)	−20.0 (−4.0)	−23.3 (−9.9)	−30.6 (−23.1)	−32.8 (−27.0)
Average precipitation mm (inches)	75.8 (2.98)	47.8 (1.88)	64.7 (2.55)	46.5 (1.83)	62.9 (2.48)	73.7 (2.90)	34.7 (1.37)	24.2 (0.95)	40.0 (1.57)	53.9 (2.12)	83.9 (3.30)	80.9 (3.19)	689 (27.12)
Average rainfall mm (inches)	32.6 (1.28)	28.1 (1.11)	55.7 (2.19)	46.0 (1.81)	63.9 (2.52)	74.9 (2.95)	36.6 (1.44)	24.6 (0.97)	41.1 (1.62)	54.4 (2.14)	64.2 (2.53)	36.8 (1.45)	558.9 (22.01)
Average snowfall cm (inches)	44.8 (17.6)	21.4 (8.4)	12.4 (4.9)	1.1 (0.4)	0.0 (0.0)	0.0 (0.0)	0.0 (0.0)	0.0 (0.0)	0.0 (0.0)	1.1 (0.4)	23.0 (9.1)	47.3 (18.6)	151.1 (59.4)
Average precipitation days (≥ 0.2 mm)	15.5	10.8	13.6	13.1	13.9	14.4	8.4	6.4	8.8	11.9	15.3	14.7	146.8
Average rainy days (≥ 0.2 mm)	7.8	7.8	12.2	12.9	13.9	14.2	8.2	6.3	8.5	12.0	12.9	6.8	123.5
Average snowy days (≥ 0.2 cm)	9.2	4.4	2.9	0.35	0.0	0.0	0.0	0.0	0.0	0.32	4.1	9.7	30.97
Mean monthly sunshine hours	51.1	89.6	140.2	189.1	236.3	242.5	300.7	290.0	212.9	145.5	58.7	41.0	1,997.5
Percentage possible sunshine	18.9	31.3	38.1	46.0	49.9	50.1	61.6	65.0	56.2	43.3	21.3	15.9	41.5
Source: Environment and Climate Change Canada (Sunshine 1981-2010)

== Flora and fauna ==
The moisture-loving western hemlock grows near the town's northern boundary; another wet-belt indicator, the western redcedar, is common in the area. The sun-loving ponderosa pine forms a larger proportion of the vegetation near Creston's southern boundary. Douglas-fir is the most common native tree throughout; other large conifers include grand fir, western larch, western white pine and lodgepole pine. Large pines other than the ponderosa are seldom seen in town, but are common in some of the woods nearby. The only native deciduous tree which matches the conifers in size is the black cottonwood. White birch and trembling aspen grow to medium size; smaller trees include the Rocky Mountain maple and bitter cherry. Prominent among the non-native trees are blue spruce, horse-chestnut, Norway maple, silver maple, and several species of walnut, including the butternut. There also are occasional examples of catalpa, chestnut, London plane, and tulip tree.

Large mammals at Creston include cougar, bear, beaver, coyote, deer, elk, moose, muskrat and river otter. More than 265 bird species occur in the Creston Valley, which is in a migration corridor for waterfowl such as geese and swans; the valley is also a wintering area for birds of prey. The Creston area hosts British Columbia's only remaining population of northern leopard frog.

== Physiography and soils ==
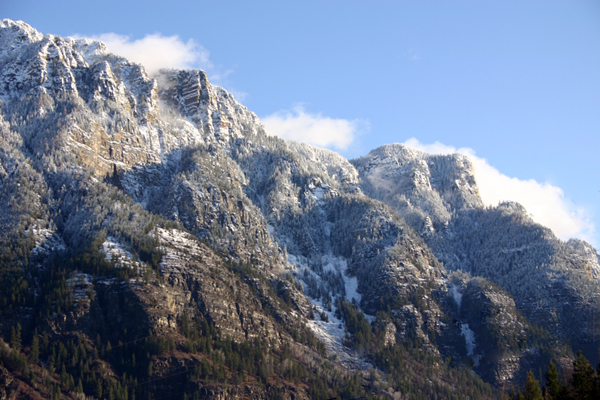
Purcell Mountains

Creston is built on rolling bench-land immediately to the east of the Kootenay River floodplain. Beyond the bench-land to the east are the Purcell Mountains; their steep west-facing scarps are mistakenly called the Skimmerhorns, while the Selkirk Mountains rise west of the floodplain.

Silt loam is the most common soil texture at Creston. The floodplain soils are dark and poorly drained for the most part; they are excellent for pasture and grains where drainage is improved. Some of the bench-land soils are brown and of good tilth; others are gray, deficient in organic matter, and have rather heavy calcareous subsoils.

== Notable current and former residents ==
- William Munroe Archibald, aviator
- Johnny Bucyk, former NHL hockey player (Detroit Red Wings, Boston Bruins)
- Irwin Crosthwait, painter
- Aaron Douglas, actor
- Edward Joseph Garland, politician and diplomat
- Jamie Huscroft, former NHL hockey player
- Pascale Hutton, actress
- Darren Jensen, former NHL goalie (Philadelphia Flyers)
- Dmytro Lazorko, politician
- Rob Morrison, politician
- John Gordon Perrin, volleyball player
- Duncan Regehr, actor
- Randy Rota, former NHL hockey player
- Francis Henry Shepherd, politician and engineer
- Jayli Wolf, musician and actress

== Youth programs ==
- Royal Canadian Army Cadets
- Royal Canadian Air Cadets

== Sports ==
- Creston Golf Club
- Creston Judo Club
- Creston Curling Club
- Creston Ospreys Rowing Club
- Creston Valley Thundercats junior 'B' hockey team
- Creston Waves Swim club
- Creston Valley Skating Club

Club	League	Sport	Venue	Established	Championships
Creston Valley Thunder Cats	KIJHL	ice hockey	Johnny Bucyk Arena	1976	0

== See also ==
- Creston Valley Wildlife Management Area
