= List of people from Lewiston, Maine =

The following list includes notable people who were born or have lived in Lewiston, Maine.

== Authors and academics ==
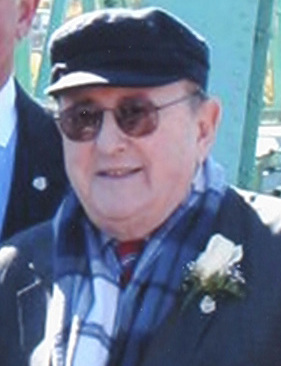
Bernard Lown

- Alice Mary Baldwin, historian and educator
- Thomas A. Desjardin, historian of the American Civil War
- Edward C. Hayes, sociologist, and president of the American Sociological Association
- Douglas Hodgkin, political scientist and historian
- Bernard Lown, pioneering cardiologist credited with inventing the defibrillator; Nobel Peace Prize recipient

== Business ==
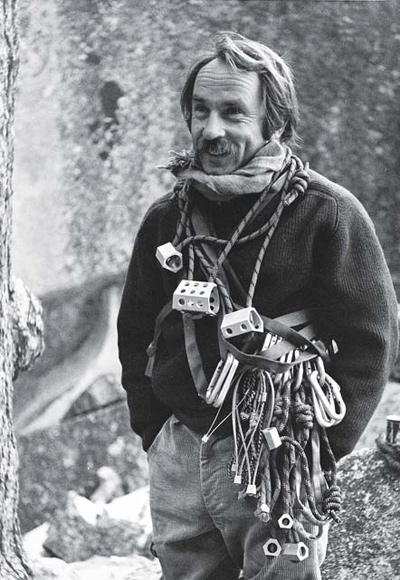
Yvon Chouinard

- Benjamin E. Bates, industrialist, founder of the Bates Mills and benefactor of Bates College
- Edward Burgess Butler, businessman and founder of Butler Brothers department stores
- Yvon Chouinard, rock climber and founder of Patagonia
- Orland Smith, railroad executive and soldier

== Media and arts ==
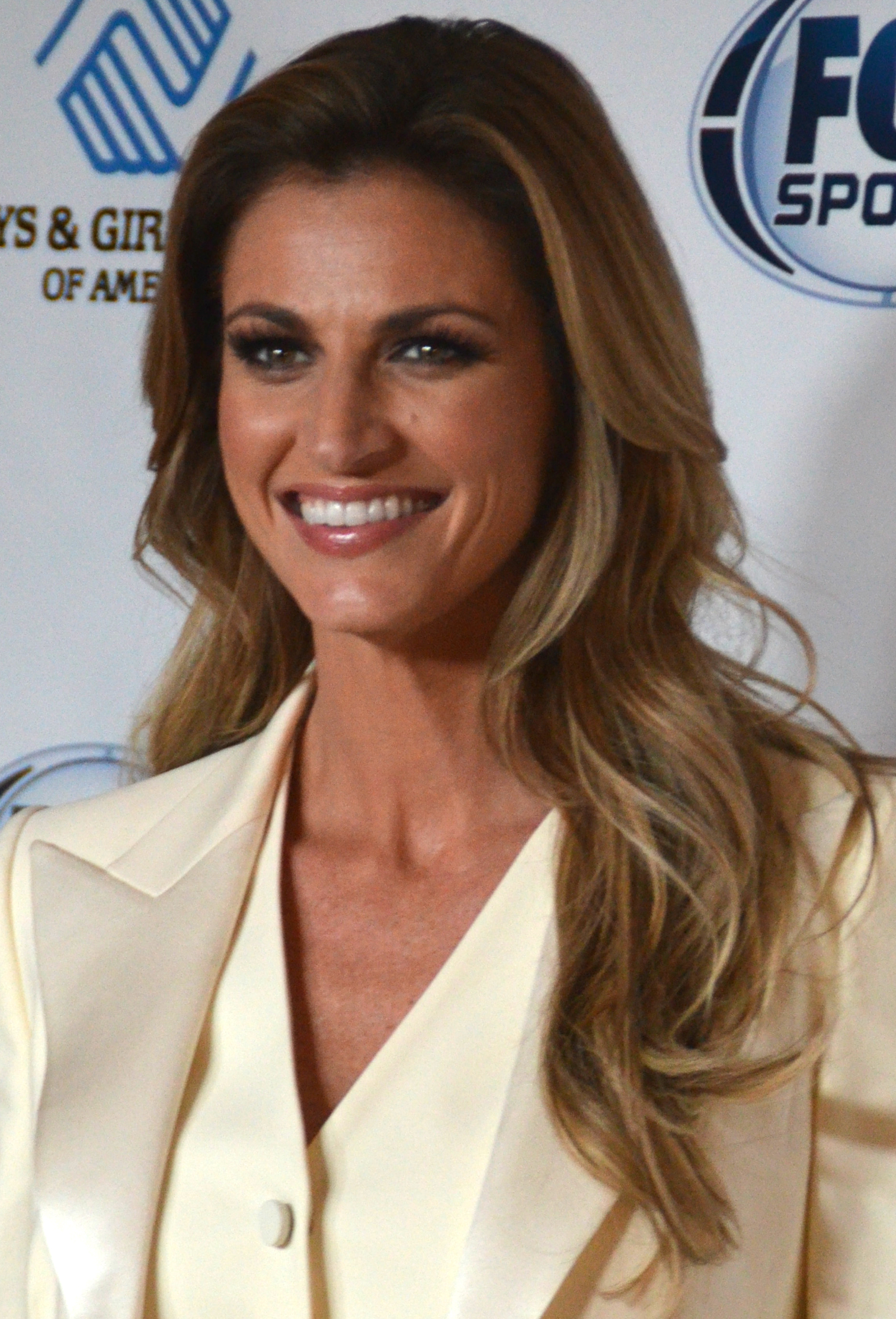
Erin Andrews

- Erin Andrews, television sports reporter, Dancing with the Stars co-host
- Tom Caron, sportscaster
- Ernie Coombs C.M., children's television entertainer and Order of Canada recipient
- Patrick Dempsey, actor, star of television series Grey's Anatomy
- Jim Flynn, songwriter
- Marsden Hartley, modernist painter
- Ray LaMontagne, folk singer and songwriter
- Cynthia McFadden, newscaster
- Rene Rancourt, singer
- Anne Taintor, artist
- Michael "Mudcat" Ward, blues bassist, pianist and songwriter
- Clarence White, guitarist and member of rock group The Byrds and bluegrass group The Kentucky Colonels
- Frances Turgeon Wiggin, composer of the song “The State of Maine”
- JoAnn Willette, actress, star of television series Just the Ten of Us

== Military, politics and law ==
- Joline Beam, state representative
- Georgette Berube, state legislator
- Romeo T. Boisvert, mayor and state legislator
- Louis J. Brann, 56th governor of Maine during the Great Depression
- T.F. Callahan, state legislator, businessperson and Maine state auditor
- Margaret Craven, state senator
- Nelson Dingley, Jr., U.S. congressman, and chairman of the House Ways and Means Committee
- Linda Smith Dyer, lawyer, lobbyist, women's rights activist, co-founder of the Maine Women's Lobby
- William P. Frye, U.S. congressman and senator; president pro tempore of the United States Senate
- Louis-Philippe Gagné, mayor of Lewiston
- Alonzo Garcelon, 36th governor of Maine
- Jared Golden, Marine veteran and U.S. representative for Maine
- Michel Lajoie, state representative and resident of Lewiston
- Paul LePage, 74th governor of Maine
- Nate Libby, state legislator
- James B. Longley, 69th governor of Maine
- James B. Longley, Jr., U.S. congressman
- Susan Longley, state senator
- Garrett Mason, state senator
- Gina Mason, state representative
- Daniel J. McGillicuddy, U.S. congressman
- John Michael, state legislator
- Frederick G. Payne, U.S. senator and the 60th governor of Maine
- Paul N. Poirier, member of the Vermont House of Representatives and Barre City Council
- Louis Scolnik, civil rights attorney and 94th Associate Justice of the Maine Supreme Judicial Court
- Peter T. Snowe, Maine state legislator
- Edward Parsons Tobie, Jr., Civil War soldier and winner of the U.S. Medal of Honor

== Sports ==
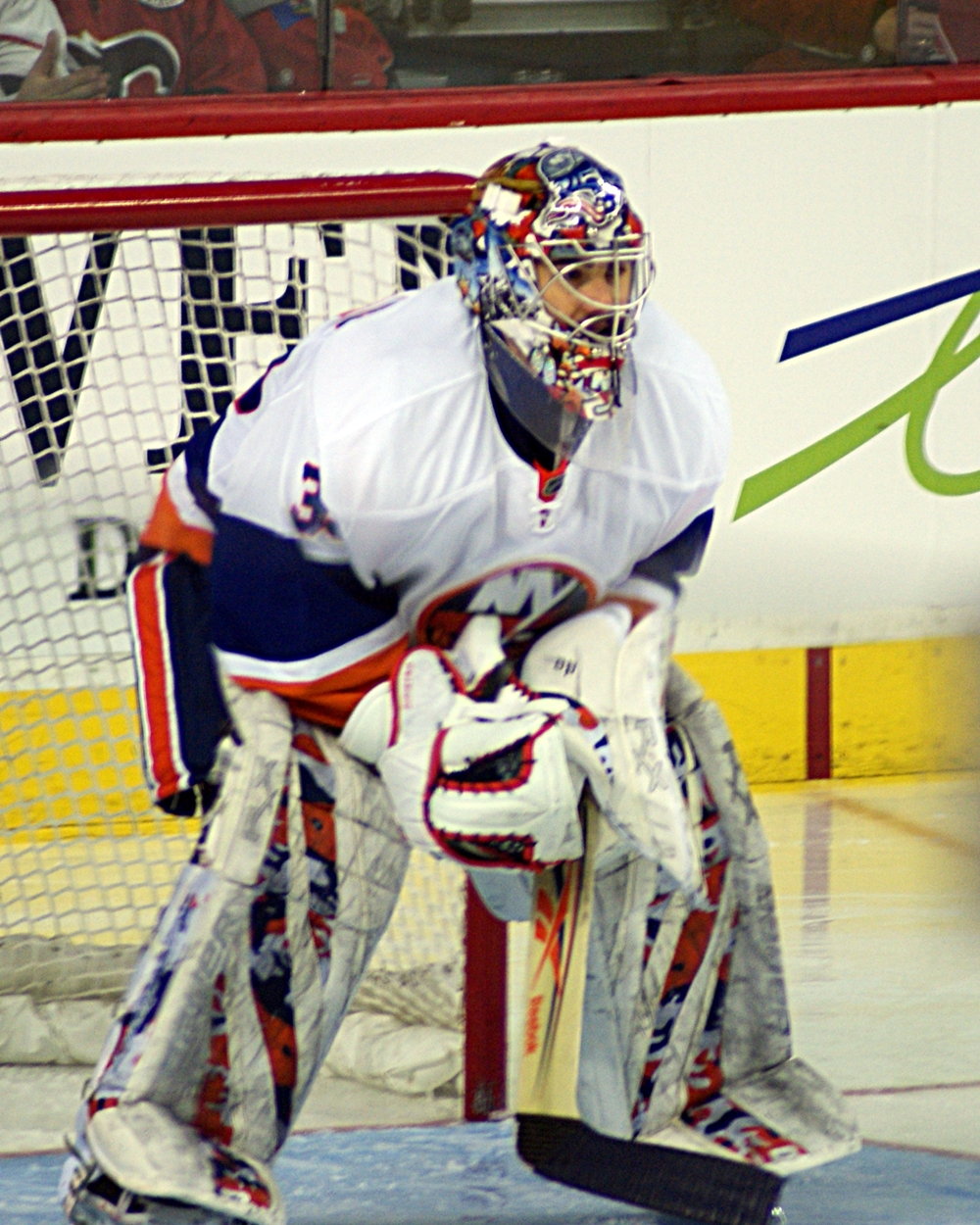
Rick DiPietro

- Bill Carrigan, manager of the Boston Red Sox and two-time World Series winner
- Walter Case, Jr., champion harness racing driver
- Rick DiPietro, former goalie for the New York Islanders
- Tom Downey, infielder for the Cincinnati Reds, Philadelphia Phillies, Chicago Cubs, and Buffalo Buffeds/Blues
- Joey Gamache, boxer and World Lightweight Champion
- Christy Gardner, member of United States women's ice sledge hockey team
- Larry Gowell, pitcher for New York Yankees who singled in his only MLB at-bat
- Marc Pelchat, two-time Olympian speed skater, 1998, Nagano/2002 Salt Lake
- Rene Rancourt, singer, regularly sang the US National Anthem, and if applicable, the Canadian National Anthem at NHL games for the Boston Bruins
- Walter Thornton, outfielder and pitcher for the Chicago Colts/Orphans
