= Robert MacDonald =

Robert MacDonald may refer to:

- Robbie MacDonald (Robert MacDonald, 1870–1946), Australian cricketer
- Robert Macdonald (South African cricketer) (born 1965)
- Robert J. MacDonald (1914–1987), politician in Michigan
- Robert MacDonald (British politician), British member of parliament for Glasgow Cathcart, 1923–1929
- Robert MacDonald (special effects artist) (1912–1989), visual effects artist of Ben-Hur
- Robert David MacDonald (1929–2004), Scottish playwright, translator, and theatre director
- Robert E. Macdonald (born 1947), American mayor of Lewiston, Maine
- Robert W. MacDonald (born 1943), insurance executive
- Robert MacDonald (minister) (1813-1893), Moderator of the General Assembly of the Free Church of Scotland in 1882

Robert McDonald may refer to:

- Robert McDonald (missionary) (1829–1913), Episcopalian missionary in the Arctic
- Robert Ross McDonald (1888–1964), Australian politician
- Robert McDonald, known as Whitey McDonald (1902–1956), Canadian soccer player who earned two caps with Ireland
- Robert N. McDonald (born 1952), justice of the Maryland Court of Appeals
- Robert McDonald (Medal of Honor), American Indian Wars soldier, see 5th Infantry Regiment

Rob MacDonald or McDonald may refer to:

- Rob McDonald (born 1959), English footballer for Hull City, Newcastle United
- Rob MacDonald (born 1978), Canadian mixed martial arts fighter

Bob MacDonald or McDonald may refer to:

- Bob MacDonald (golfer) (1885–1960), Scottish-American professional golfer
- Bob McDonald (Scottish footballer) (1895–1971), footballer for Inverness Caledonian, Tottenham Hotspur
- Bob McDonald (Australian footballer) (1895–1979), Australian rules footballer for South Melbourne
- Bob McDonald (ice hockey) (1923–1977), professional ice hockey player
- Bob McDonald (bowls) (1933–2006), New Zealand bowls player
- Bob MacDonald (baseball) (born 1965), American former Major League Baseball pitcher
- Bob MacDonald (journalist) (1929–2006), Canadian columnist for the Toronto Telegram and Toronto Sun
- Bob McDonald (politician) (1931–2002), Canadian member of parliament and football player
- Bob McDonald (businessman) (born 1953), U.S. Secretary of Veterans Affairs, CEO Procter and Gamble
- Bob McDonald (science journalist) (born 1951), for Canadian program Quirks and Quarks

Bobby McDonald may refer to:

- Bobby McDonald (born 1955), Scottish footballer for Coventry City and Oxford United

== See also ==
- Bob McDonnell (born 1954), governor of Virginia
