= Paul Couture =

Paul Couture may refer to:

- Paul Couture (Canadian politician) (1833–1913), dairy farmer and political figure in Quebec
- Paul A. Couture (1913–1992), American politician
- Paul Couture (sailor), French sailor
