= Butler Brothers Department Stores =

Defunct department store chain

The Butler Brothers Department Stores were a chain of department stores that opened in the 1950s.

Merchandising company Butler Brothers built 2 complete department stores in Ohio and 4 in Greater Los Angeles, and one each in San Francisco and Seattle.

== Greater Los Angeles ==
- Lakewood Center (1952), 5252 Lakewood Blvd., 2 stories, 90,000 sq ft (8,400 m^{2}), opened November 8, 1951 to more than 175,000 visitors in one day. Its first customer was film star Joyce Holden.
- Alhambra, 343 E. Main St., opened November 15, 1951, helping anchor its busy downtown, a key shopping district in the San Gabriel Valley. Closed c. 1973. No parking lot. Later home to Nahas department store which closed in 1980.
- Ontario, 317–327 N. Euclid Ave., 55-60 employees, opened September 19, 1961, 35,600 sq ft (3,310 m^{2})
- Van Nuys 6609 Van Nuys Boulevard northwest corner of Kittridge, opened September 21, 1951, with 125,000 sq ft (11,600 m^{2}) total space. This would later become a branch of Dearden's, a department store selling furniture, appliances and jewelry aimed at Latino residents.

In the 1960s the Los Angeles buying office and plant was at 3030 South Atlantic Boulevard in Vernon, an industrial suburb of Southeast Los Angeles County.

== San Francisco ==
- Stonestown Shopping Center in a suburban area of the city of San Francisco.

== Ohio ==
- Cleveland metropolitan area, Euclid, Ohio, E. 222nd at Lake Shore Blvd. opened in April, 1951, originally a Scott-Burr store.
- Cincinnati, 616–628 Race Street, opened October 1, 1951. The store consisted of four sales levels and employed a staff of 200. Butler Bros. covered the Victorian storefront in a sleek, then-modern brick façade. The store had been A. E. Burkhardt's furriers, then Miller's department store, then a J. J. Newberry variety store. The Butler Brothers closed by 1960 when it was turned into a Kroger grocery; later the building was a Singer shop, then a Wurlitzer shop, then The Chong from 1988 until March 2020.

== Washington State ==
- Northgate Mall, Seattle

== Federated Stores ==
The Butler Brothers Department Stores should not be confused with Federated Stores, also under Butler Brothers, which started c. 1931 which were ca. 1400 independently owned and operated department stores based on a common operating model and selling goods acquired through the Butler Brothers wholesale network.
