= Federated Stores =

Federated Stores may refer to:

- Federated Department Stores, Inc., formed in 1929, renamed in 1992 to Federated Stores, Inc., renamed Macy's, Inc. in 2007
- Federated Stores, formed c. 1931, a chain of independently owned and operated stores supplied by Butler Brothers
