= Senator Lessard =

Senator Lessard may refer to:

- Alton A. Lessard (1909–1976), Maine State Senate
- Bob Lessard (born 1931), Minnesota State Senate
