= Lewiston City Hall =

Lewiston City Hall may refer to:

- Lewiston City Hall (Lewiston, Idaho), listed on the National Register of Historic Places in Nez Perce County, Idaho
- Lewiston City Hall (Lewiston, Maine), listed on the National Register of Historic Places in Androscoggin County, Maine
