= Jacob Ham =

1st Mayor of Lewiston, Maine
- In office 2 March 1863 – 1864
- Preceded by: Office established
- Succeeded by: William P. Frye

Member of the Maine House of Representatives from Lewiston
- In office 1854–1856

Personal details
- Born: March 24, 1824 Lewiston, Maine, United States
- Died: September 3, 1888 (aged 64)

Jacob Barker Ham (24 March 1824 – 3 September 1888) was an American politician and businessman who served as the first mayor of Lewiston, Maine, from 1863 to 1864.

== Biography ==
=== Early life and political career ===
Jacob Barker Ham was born in Lewiston, Maine on 24 March 1824, to colonel Ebenezer and Judith Ham. He attended Lewiston Falls Academy, and as a young adult was passionate about mercantile trade.

Ham's 'rugged' character drew public attention throughout Androscoggin County. He was elected to the Maine House of Representatives, representing his hometown, for the 1854 to 1856 term.

From 1859 through 1862, Ham was a member of Lewiston's board of selectmen. In the last two years of his tenure, he was also the chairman. Ham was elected to be Lewiston's inaugural mayor, upon the ratification of its city charter, on 2 March 1863; the local government was established shortly thereafter on 16 March.

The city, which was previously a town, had been elevated as such by the Maine Legislature two years prior; however, the outbreak of the Civil War resulted in municipal action being postponed. During the Civil War, Lewiston was under significant financial and manpower quotas, which Ham, reportedly, never missed.

=== Post-political career ===
On 1 February 1866, Ham sold 37 or 38 acres of land to the City of Lewiston for $3,500, which would become the site of a city hospital. While initially for the poor and those with generic sicknesses, it also housed smallpox patients, despite the existence of a separate pest house. The hospital operated until its closure on 1 June 1876.

Ham bought Squirrel Island in July 1870, after camping there with future congressman Nelson Dingley and other area men. For this he paid $2,200, which included the island itself as well as two farmhouses and sixty sheep. In the center of the island was a natural spring, which, upon being tested by a Rochester University chemistry professor, was found to provide the 'purest' water yet from Maine; even more so than that of Poland Spring, which was regarded as the finest of the time.

In 1871, Ham transferred ownership of the island to the Squirrel Island Association, of which he was president, and which was chartered by the state government. In the coming years, Squirrel Island would become a successful summer colony.

Ham attended the grand opening of the Sebasticook and Moosehead Railroad on 17 November 1886.

An intellectual, antiquarian, and traveler, Ham visited almost every state in the United States, as well as Mexico, Cuba, and Europe.

He died on 3 September 1888 and is buried in Riverside Cemetery.
