= Louis-Philippe Gagné =

American politician

Mayor of Lewiston
- In office 1947–1948
- Preceded by: Alton A. Lessard
- Succeeded by: Armand G. Sansoucy

Personal details
- Born: April 16, 1900 Quebec City, Quebec, Canada
- Died: January 13, 1964 (aged 63)

Louis-Philippe Gagné (April 16, 1900- January 13, 1964) was a French Canadian American journalist, snowshoe enthusiast, and politician. He wrote an influential and widely circulated political column in Le Messager and served as mayor of Lewiston, Maine, from 1947 to 1949.

Gagné was born in 1900 in Quebec City to Elphege and Georgianna Gagné. He was a protege of Cardinal Louis-Nazaire Bégin and entered seminary. In 1917, he began working for Le Soleil newspaper. Five years later, he emigrated to Lewiston, Maine, United States, and became editor of Le Messager, the city's Francophone newspaper. He became a citizen of the United States in 1928 and ran for ward clerk that same year. He was elected to the Lewiston School Committee in 1930 and served in that position until 1934. During the 1940s, he served two terms on the Lewiston City Council. During World War II, he served on the local Selective Service Board.

He also formed a number of civic and sporting organizations, including Le Club Montagnard (The Mountaineer Club), which was the first snowshoe running organization in the United States.

The Louis-Philippe Gagné Papers are held by the Franco-American collection at the University of Southern Maine. In May 2013, he was posthumously inducted into the Maine Franco-American Hall of Fame by the Maine Legislature.

== See also ==
- List of mayors of Lewiston, Maine
