= Edward Burgess Butler =

American businessman

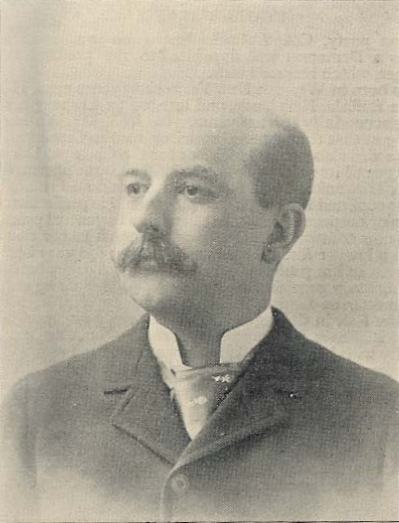
- Born: December 16, 1853; Lewiston, Maine
- Died: February 20, 1928 (aged 74); Pasadena, California
- Parent(s): Manly Orville Butler; Elizabeth Howe
- Relatives: Orville Washington Butler, George Henry Butler, Arthur Caverno Butler, Charles Hamblet Butler, Frank Fairfield Butler, Sarah Elizabeth Butler, and Olivia Annette Butler, brothers and sisters

Edward Burgess Butler (December 16, 1853 – February 20, 1928) was an American businessman who founded Butler Brothers department stores. He served as the first president of the Pasadena Society of Artists.

== Biography ==
He was born on December 16, 1853, in Lewiston, Maine to Manly Orville Butler and Elizabeth Howe. He had eight siblings: two of them, George H. Bulter and Charles H. Butler formed a partnership with Edward. Manly owned a grocery store. In 1858, his family moved to Boston, Massachusetts, and he attended the Boston public school system.

Together with his brothers, George and Charles, he founded Butler Brothers in Boston in 1877.

For five years he sold goods throughout New England and Canada as a traveling salesman. He married Jane Holly in 1880, she was the daughter of William Henry Holly, of Norwalk, Connecticut.

With his wealth he collected works by George Inness, and later donated the collection to the Art Institute of Chicago. Having trained under Frank Charles Peyraud, Butler became a landscape painter. For a time he exhibited his works under a pseudonym, "Edward Burgess". In 1908, he exhibited at the Art Institute of Chicago. One of his oil paintings was displayed at the Panama–Pacific International Exposition in 1915.

Butler moved to Pasadena, California after he retired from business. He died in Pasadena, California on February 20, 1928.

== Titles ==
- Director of Illinois Merchants Trust Company
- Chairman of Ways and Means committee
- Chairman of the World's Columbian Exposition
- President of the Glenwood, Illinois Manual Training School
- Trustee of Hull House
- Trustee of Chicago Orphan Asylum
- Trustee of Girls' Refuge
- Trustee of First State Pawners' Society
- Trustee of Art Institute of Chicago
