= Pasadena Society of Artists =

The Pasadena Society of Artists is a nonprofit arts organization in southern California, United States. It holds annual art exhibitions of its members' art works.

== Overview ==
Pasadena Society of Artists, from its founding, attracted practitioners of a variety of artistic styles, including impressionists, modernists, abstract artists and traditionalists.

During its formative years, the Pasadena Society of Artists was associated with the Pasadena Arts Institute. As a result, its membership had close ties with the Pasadena Museum of Art (which later became the Norton Simon Museum) and the Pacific Asia Museum.

== History ==
In 1925, Pasadena Society of Artists was founded with 15 members.

=== 1920s to 1950s ===
PSA's formation closely followed the founding of the Pasadena Arts Institute, and many of its first members were involved in the creation of both institutions. Its first president was landscape artist Edward B. Butler, a successful businessman who retired to pursue his career as an oil painter. Early members of the Society included nationally renowned artists, including California impressionists Alson S. Clark and Marion Wachtel, and the noted adherent of the Arts and Crafts movement Ernest A. Batchelder,

From the 1920s into the 1950s, Pasadena Society of Artists was given an office and exhibit space in the Grace Nicholson Galleries, located at 46 North Los Robles Avenue. However, the society eventually lost the space when the Nicholson gallery became the Pacific Asia Museum.

== Exhibitions ==
Pasadena Society of Artists continues to hold frequent juried exhibitions of its members works, and its Annual Exhibitions have taken place without interruption since 1925.

Despite the lack of a permanent exhibition space, the Pasadena Society of Artists holds annual exhibitions of its members art works.

In 2020, it held an Inaugural Digital Exhibition from July 20, 2020, to August 20, 2020.
