= List of mayors of Lewiston, Maine =

The following is a list of mayors of the city of Lewiston, Maine, United States.

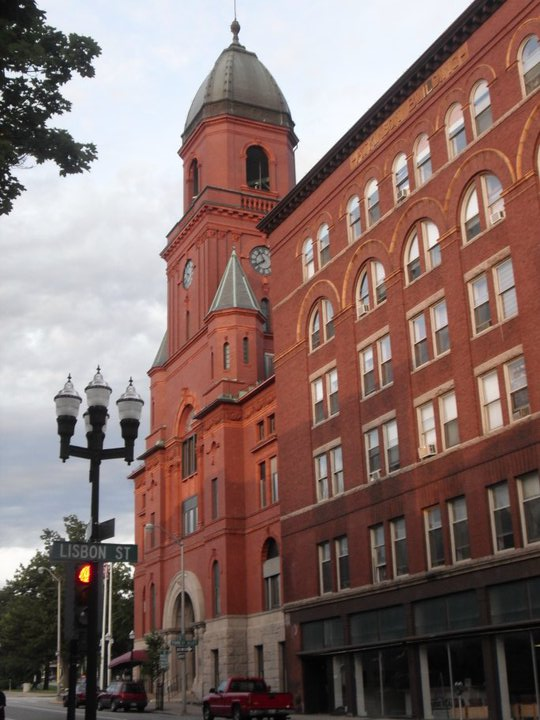
View of City Hall building (left) in Lewiston, Maine, 2010

- Jacob B. Ham, 1863-1864
- William P. Frye, 1865-1866
- George H. Pillsbury, 1867
- Isaac N. Parker, 1868-1869
- William H. Stevens, 1870
- Alonzo Garcelon, 1871
- David Cowan, 1872, 1886
- N. W. Farwell, 1873
- H. H. Dickey, 1874
- Edmund Russell, 1875-1877
- Jesse S. Lyford, 1878
- Joseph H. Day, 1879-1880
- M. T. Ludden, 1881
- David Farrar, 1882
- A. M. Garcelon, 1883
- Nelson Howard, ca.1884-1885
- Chas. Walker, 1885
- Daniel J. McGillicuddy, 1887, 1890, 1902
- Horace C. Little, 1888-1889
- William H. Newell, 1891–1892, 1898, 1921
- Seth Chandler, 1893
- Frank L. Noble, 1894-1897
- W. H. Judkins, 1897
- George Pottle, 1899
- George W. Furbush, 1900-1901
- Wm. B. Skelton, 1903-1904
- William E. Webster, 1905-1906
- Frank A. Morey, 1907-1912
- W. H. Hines, 1913
- Robert J. Wiseman, 1914, 1925–1929, 1933-1935
- Louis J. Brann, 1915–1916, 1922-1924
- Charles P. Lemaire, 1917-1920
- Harold N. Skelton, 1930-1931
- Henry N. Paradis, 1932
- Donat J. Levesque, 1935-1938
- Edward J. Beauchamp, 1939
- Fernand Despins, 1939-1940
- Edmond J. Lambert, 1941-1942
- Jean Charles Boucher, 1943-1944
- Alton A. Lessard, 1945-1946
- Louis-Philippe Gagné, 1947-1948
- Armand G. Sansoucy, 1949-1950
- Ernest Malenfant, 1951, 1954-1955
- Roland L. Marcotte, 1952–1953, 1964
- Georges Rancourt, 1956-1957
- Romeo T. Boisvert, 1958-1959
- Emile Jacques, 1960-1961
- Donia J. Girard, 1962-1963
- Robert L. Couturier, 1965-1966
- William Rocheleau Jr., 1967-1968
- John B. Beliveau, 1969-1970
- Robert W. Clifford, 1971-1972
- John C. Orestis, 1973-1975
- Lillian Caron, 1976-1979
- Paul R. Dionne, 1980-1983
- Alfred A. Plourde, 1984-1987
- Maurice L. Labbe, 1988-1989
- James P. Howaniec, 1990-1993
- John T. Jenkins, 1994-1997
- Kaileigh A. Tara, 1998-2001
- Laurier T. Raymond Jr., 2000-2003
- Lionel Guay Jr., 2004-2006
- Laurent F. Gilbert Sr., 2007-2011
- Robert MacDonald, 2012-2017
- Shane Bouchard, 2018-2019
- Kristen S. Cloutier, 2019
- Mark A. Cayer, 2020-2022
- Carl Sheline, 2022–present

== See also ==
- Lewiston City Hall
- Lewiston history
