= Nahas =

Los Angeles department store chain

- Industry: Retail
- Founded: 1951; 75 years ago
- Founder: A. S. Nahas
- Defunct: 1982

Nahas (pronounced Nay-haz) was a chain of department stores owned by A. S. Nahas, operating in Greater Los Angeles, carrying clothing, household goods and electronics. They also acquired Rathbun's department store at 5311 Lankershim Boulevard in North Hollywood and cobranded it "Nahas Rathbuns" before the branch closed in 1980. The remaining Nahas stores were closed from 1981 to 1982.

The Nahas chain originated as a partnership between A. S. Nahas and Donald R. Nuss in 1951. In 1970 the company was incorporated. Nahas died December 13, 1970. As of 1974, Nuss was the CEO.

== Branches ==
The order of opening of the first eight stores is documented as follows:

- 1-2. Burbank, 1611 Verdugo Avenue, one of the first two stores opened, in 1953, remodeled in 1958
- 1-2. Hollywood, one of the first two stores opened, in 1953
- 3. Gardena, 1250 West Redondo Beach Boulevard, third store, opened in 1954
- 4. Panorama City/"Pacoima" (Nahas referred to this branch as "Pacoima"; it has also been reported as "Panorama City", which is the neighborhood to which the address corresponds today), 9035 Woodman Avenue, Woodman Square shopping center, fourth store, opened 1955
- 5. Sherman Oaks, 4520 Van Nuys Boulevard, fifth store, 30,000 square feet (2,800 m^{2}), opened in 1958-9
- 6. Long Beach, 3008 Bellflower Boulevard, 14,000 square feet (1,300 m^{2}), sixth store, opened in 1960, E. H. Reid - store manager at opening
- 7. La Habra, La Habra Square shopping center, 2131 West Central Avenue (now La Habra Boulevard), 24,000 square feet (2,200 m^{2}), current site of Costco, opened c. March 1961, the chain's seventh store, 18,000 square feet (1,700 m^{2})
- 8. Granada Hills, North Valley Plaza Shopping Center, Chatsworth Street at Balboa Boulevard, eighth store, opened 1962
- 9. La Crescenta, 2651 Foothill Boulevard, opened before Tustin branch
- 10.Tustin, Tustin Heights Shopping Center, 1134 Irvine Boulevard, 22,000 square feet (2,000 m^{2}), tenth store, opened December 2, 1965, closed 1981

Later advertisements promote these additional following branches:

- Hanford, Kings Mall Shopping Center
- Irvine, 14280 Culver Drive
- North Hollywood (orig. Rathbun's, opened 1921, acquired around 1971), 5311 Lankershim Boulevard
- Rancho Bernardo, San Diego, 11965 Bernardo Plaza Drive (was reported as being under construction in 1974)
- Santa Barbara branded Trenwiths, after acquisition of that store
- Santa Susana/Simi Valley, 2242 Tapo Street
- Thousand Oaks, originally 316 North Moorpark Road, relocated to a 30,000-square-foot (2,800 m^{2}) store in Conejo Valley Plaza in 1979
- Van Nuys, 6609 Van Nuys Boulevard, originally Butler Bros. Department Store (founded 1951), acquired 1974

== A. S. Nahas ==
Mr. Abe (or "Abraham" as listed in the 1910 census) Salem Nahas was born in Tripoli, then in Ottoman Syria, now Lebanon, on August 16, 1895 (as reported on his WWII draft card, 1920 census, and obituary) to Selami and Mary Nahas. Young Abraham emigrated to the United States at age 5 with his parents and siblings George, Elsie and Edna, and the family settled in San Francisco. Shortly after the 1906 San Francisco Earthquake the family moved to Los Angeles. In 1910, the family was registered on Holmes Avenue in San Antonio Township, Florence Precinct, in what is now referred to as Florence, California, an unincorporated area adjacent to South Los Angeles. At age 22, Nahas was an escrow clerk at an insurance and trust company at 5th and Spring streets and lived at 784 East Washington Boulevard in what is now southeastern Downtown Los Angeles. He was described as short, of medium build, with blue eyes and dark brown hair.

Nahas married Edith Rector in 1918 and had two daughters, Virginia and Lorraine. He was a Mason.

Nahas started working in retail in 1918 and became the manager of the Woolworth five and dimes in Prescott, Arizona (where he resided during the 1920 census), Santa Rosa, California and Hollywood. In 1937 he became a partner in a department store chain, and in 1939 was managing a five and ten cent store at 6410 Hollywood Boulevard when burglars broke in and stole a small safe with $1,200 in cash inside. His WWII draft card shows Abe and Edith Nahas living at 753 1/2 N. Croft Ave. in Hollywood at that time and his employer as Woolworth's.

Nahas later founded Nahas department stores as a partnership with Donald Nuss in 1951. The Nahases had a home in Newport Beach, featured in the Los Angeles Times in 1958, stretching 110 feet (34 m) along the breakwater, designed by architect Herbert Brownell. The home had a panorama wall of glass providing an ocean view. In 1966, Nahas opened Toluca Villa, a 42-unit, 3-story apartment complex at 10240 Camarillo St., in North Hollywood.

Nahas died December 13, 1970.
