= Robert W. MacDonald =

American insurance entrepreneur, business person, and author

Robert W. MacDonald (born February 11, 1943) is an American insurance entrepreneur, business consultant, blogger, and author of business books.

MacDonald began his career as a door-to-door salesman and became a CEO of three major insurance companies. He was president of ITT Life Insurance Company, and was a founder and CEO of Life USA. He sold Life USA in 1999 to Allianz SE for $540 million and became CEO of Allianz Life of North America before retiring in 2002.

== Early life ==
Robert W. “Bob” MacDonald was born in Rochester, New York, the son of middle-class parents. His father had been a mortician before World War II, but later became an X-ray technician after developing an allergic reaction to embalming chemicals. His mother also worked in the medical field as a nurse and medical secretary.

The MacDonald family moved West in 1946, first to Arizona and then to California where MacDonald spent most of his formative years. A rebellious and often mischievous youth, MacDonald's parents attempted to shape up the youth by sending him to the highly structured St. John's Military Academy and then to Loyola High School, a Jesuit college preparatory school for young men in hopes of reforming his contrarian lifestyle, but his disrespect for traditional rules continued.

Although he grew up in a family of health care specialists, he was hired as a 17-year-old high school junior by Coast Federal Savings & Loan of Los Angeles (now merged with Bank of the West) to deliver patriotic speeches to rotary clubs, churches, veterans’ groups and other organizations. He was paid $50 a speech plus gas mileage and $1 for every audience member. He often earned hundreds of dollars each week.

== MacDonald’s Maverick Lifestyle ==
MacDonald's contrarian lifestyle first came to the notice of national media when he bluffed his way into the 1960 Democratic National Convention headquarters of the Democratic National Committee, at the Biltmore Hotel in Los Angeles.

The 17-year-old MacDonald spent a week mingling with delegates, and rubbing shoulders with John F. Kennedy, Lyndon Johnson, and Bobby Kennedy (who gave MacDonald a PT-109 tie clip).

A suspicious newspaper reporter finally discovered MacDonald's fraud. The now defunct Los Angeles Herald-Examiner profiled MacDonald the following day as “The Delegate Who Isn’t Spins a Yarn.”

MacDonald pulled a similar prank later during the 1960 presidential campaign when John F. Kennedy was the featured speaker at a rally at the Shrine Auditorium in Los Angeles. MacDonald faked his way onto the stage where the youthful prankster was seated a few feet from JFK.

== Business career ==
In 1965, MacDonald became a neophyte “knock-on-the-door” insurance agent for New England Mutual Life (later absorbed by Metropolitan Life . MacDonald then built sales agency in Southern California for Jefferson-Pilot (now Lincoln Financial Group ), served as director of marketing support for State Mutual of America (became Allmerica Life, defunct, find under Hanover Insurance) and was chief marketing officer, chief operating officer, then president and CEO of Minneapolis-based ITT Life, owned by The Hartford .

In the early 1980s, as president of ITT Life Insurance, he launched a public campaign against his industry's most popular family of policies -- whole life. ”He had the bad taste to say what everybody knew: Whole life insurance had ceased to be a good buy” and further charged the insurance industry with being “ossified, petrified, myopic and inbred.” In response, he was vilified by his peers. The pundits notwithstanding, his “Your Whole Life is a Mistake” advertising and publicity campaign was a major success.

== Life USA is Established ==
In the late 1980s, having led an expansion of the company, MacDonald tried to buy ITT and instead, was fired. He then formed a new life insurance company, Life USA, also in Minneapolis-St. Paul The new insurance company offered independent agents who sell its policies an ownership stake in the company. and encouraged agents to become “capitalists rather than captives”

As a founder, chairman and CEO, MacDonald led Life USA into a profitable, publicly traded company with sales exceeding $1 billion, assets of more than $6 billion and more than 80,000 agents contracted to represent the company. In 1999, he sold the company to Munich, Germany-based financial services giant Allianz in a deal valued at $540 million.

Life USA was merged with the larger Allianz Life of North America. In an unusual corporate move, MacDonald was asked to continue on as CEO of the merged companies. Under his direction, according to the Minneapolis/St.Paul Business Journal, Allianz Life became a star performer in the Allianz worldwide group.

In 2006, he was lured out of retirement to kick-start and serve as the chief executive of Allianz Income Management Services (AIMS), a new company formed by Allianz to respond to retirement income needs of retiring baby boomers. He resigned from the position in 2007.

== Book Authorship ==
MacDonald is the author of several business books. His latest work, Old MacDonald's Ethical Leadership Farm: Growing New Leaders for New Times. His earlier works include Beat The System: 11 Secrets to Building an Entrepreneurial Culture in a Bureaucratic World, (John Wiley & Sons, New York, NY) was published in October 2007. He also wrote Cheat To Win – The Honest Way to Break All the Dishonest Rules in Business (Paradon Publishing 2005).

A fourth work, Control Your Future (National Underwriter Press ), was written primarily for the life insurance industry.

== Columnist and Blogger ==
Bob MacDonald is a columnist for a number of business publications including Best's Review and Insurance Marketing, and is a frequent contributor to Directors and Boards. His philosophy has been profiled in scores of local and national publications, including The Wall Street Journal, USA Today, Forbes, Business Week, American Banker and Institutional Investor.

He also has written articles dealing with management and the financial services industry.

MacDonald hosts his own Internet blog, BobMacOnBusiness. The site was created to provide advice for entrepreneurs and management professionals.

== Public Speaking ==
He has been a speaker before over 100 organizations, primarily in the financial services industries. As a keynote speaker, he has addressed banking organizations, actuaries, life underwriters, financial planners, investors, and Rotary groups.

== Directorships ==
Formerly, MacDonald has served as a director for:

- ITT Life Insurance Company, Minneapolis (1980–1987)
- Girl Scouts of the USA(1982–1997),
- Life USA Holding, Inc., Minneapolis (1987–2000)
- Arthritis Foundation, Minneapolis (1990–2002)
- Boy Scouts of America, Minneapolis (1992–2002)
- Allianz Life of North America, Minneapolis (1999–2006)
- Triple Net Properties, LLC, Santa Ana, CA (2003–2004)
- The Fireman's Fund Insurance Company, Novato, CA (2004–2006)
- Allianz Income Management Services, Minneapolis, (2006–2007)
- Buffalo Wild Wings, Minneapolis, (2003–2012)

== Family and Personal ==
MacDonald married Patricia Kathleen Crean in 1968. The couple had six children. The marriage was dissolved in 1997. . MacDonald married Brenda Zoe Anderson in 2001.
