= Van Nuys =

- Neighborhood of Los Angeles
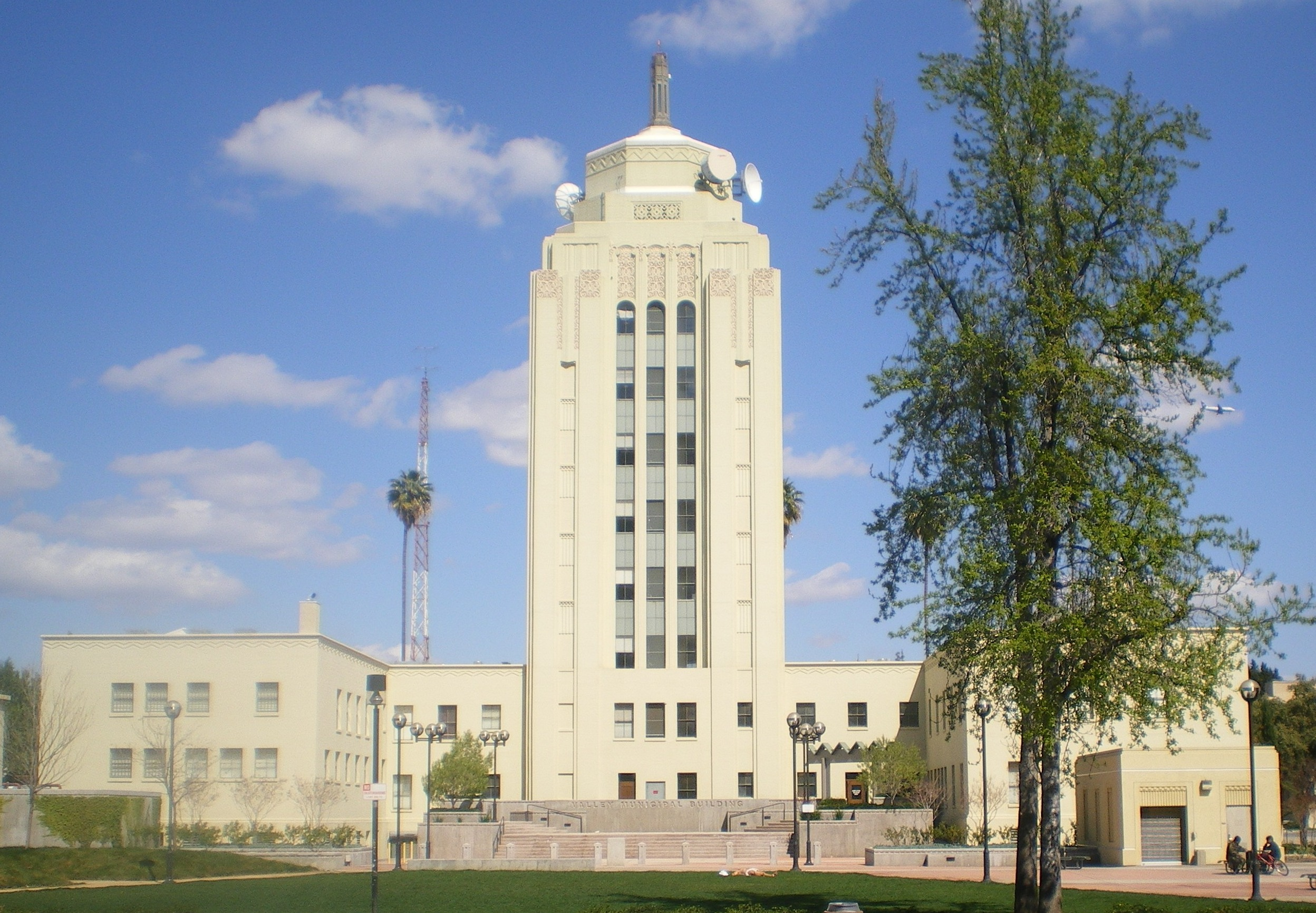
- Van Nuys City Hall
- Nickname: The Heart of the Valley
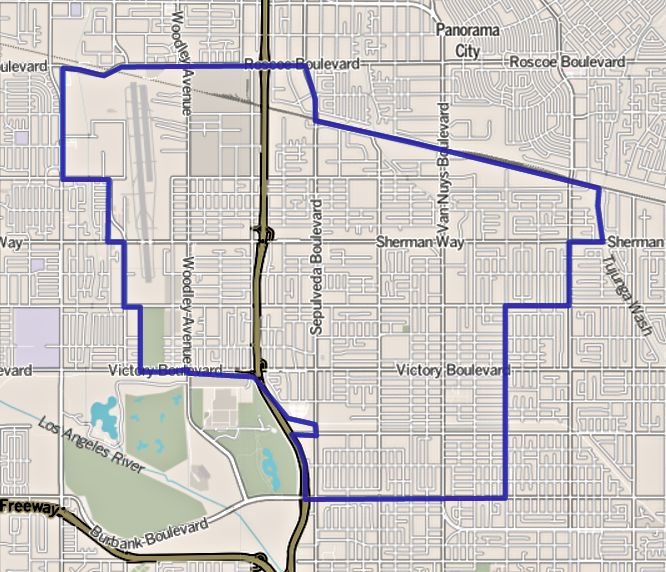
- Boundaries of Van Nuys as drawn by the Los Angeles Times

- Location within Los Angeles and the San Fernando Valley Van Nuys (the Los Angeles metropolitan area)
- Coordinates: 34°11′12.02″N 118°26′55.47″W
- Country: United States
- State: California
- County: Los Angeles
- City: Los Angeles
- Named for: Isaac Newton Van Nuys
- Elevation: 712 ft (217 m)

Population (2000)
  - Total: 136,443
- Time zone: UTC-8 (PST)
  - Summer (DST): UTC-7 (PDT)
- ZIP code: 91401, 91405, 91406, 91409, 91411
- Area codes: 747, 818

Van Nuys (/væn ˈnaɪz/ van NYZE) is a neighborhood in the central San Fernando Valley region of Los Angeles, California, United States. Home to Van Nuys Airport and the Valley Municipal Building, it is the most populous neighborhood in the San Fernando Valley.

== History ==
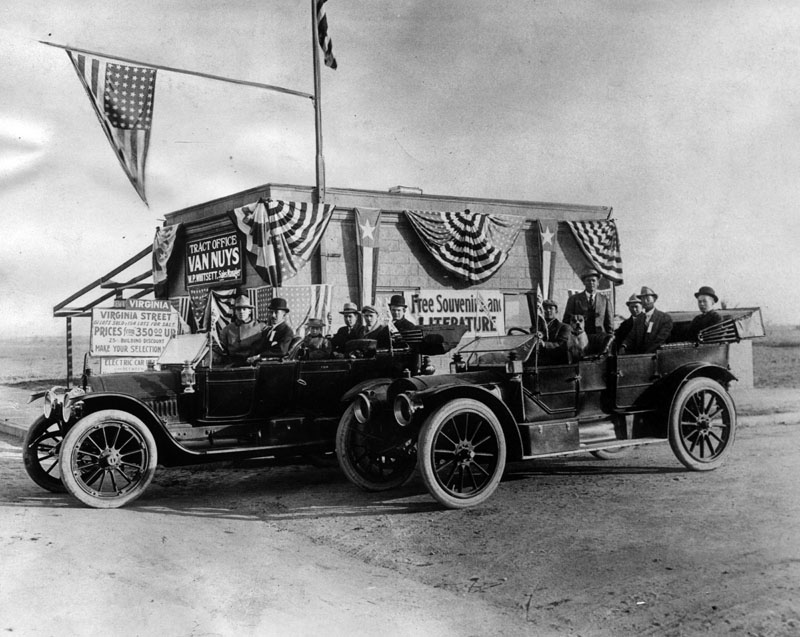
W. P. Whitsett's real estate office, 1911. His homestead would be the site of Butler Brothers Department Store, later Dearden's on Van Nuys Blvd. at Kittridge.

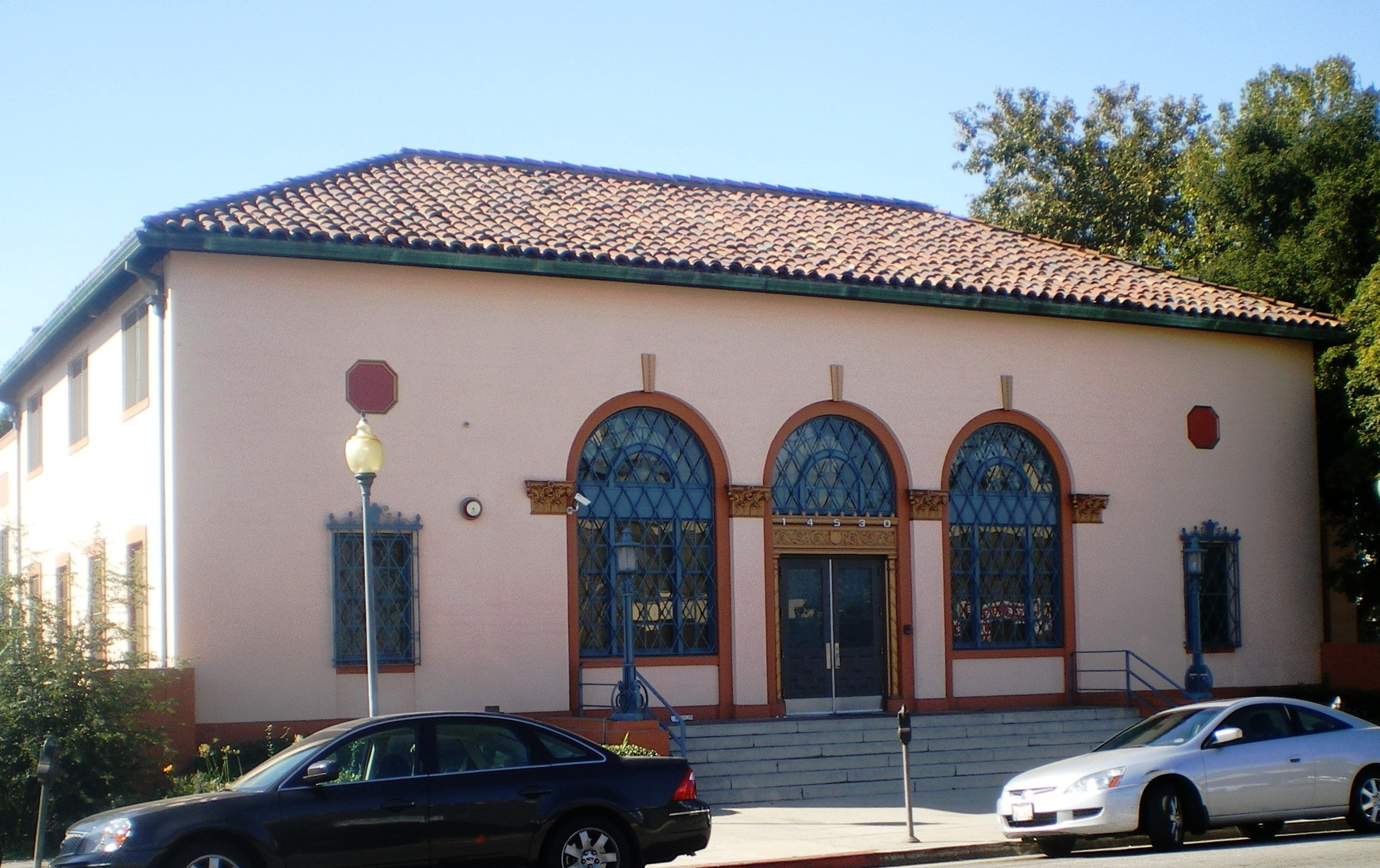
The Van Nuys Post Office, built in 1935, was designed in the Spanish Colonial Revival style.

In 1909, the Suburban Homes Company – a syndicate led by Hobart Johnstone Whitley, general manager of the board of control, along with Harry Chandler, H. G. Otis, M. H. Sherman and O. F. Brandt – purchased 48,000 acres of the Farming and Milling Company for $2.5 million. Henry E. Huntington extended his Pacific Electric Railway (Red Cars) through the Valley to Owensmouth (now Canoga Park). The Suburban Home Company laid out plans for roads and the towns of Van Nuys, Reseda (Marian) and Canoga Park (Owensmouth). The rural areas were annexed into the city of Los Angeles in 1915.

The town was founded in 1911 and named for one of its developers, Isaac Newton Van Nuys, a rancher and entrepreneur of Dutch ancestry. It was annexed by Los Angeles on May 22, 1915, after completion of the Los Angeles Aqueduct, providing it with the water required for further growth. Van Nuys was the first new stop on the San Fernando Line of the Pacific Electric Railway red cars system, which boosted its early land sales and commercial success. From as far as Alhambra, in 1917, day trips were organized for potential buyers of five-acre farms (2.0 ha).

Van Nuys became the Valley's satellite Los Angeles municipal civic center with the 1932 Art Deco Valley Municipal Building (Van Nuys City Hall), a visual landmark and Los Angeles Historic-Cultural Monument, starting the present-day Government Center complex of government services buildings.

In 1991, Marvin Braude, a member of the Los Angeles City Council, redesignated a 45-block area of Van Nuys as a part of Sherman Oaks. This redesignated area included the community of Magnolia Woods. Some area residents had presented a petition and several original deeds that stated "Sherman Oaks" to Braude. They argued that the area was a part of Sherman Oaks until the 1960s, when ZIP Codes labeling the area as Van Nuys were established.

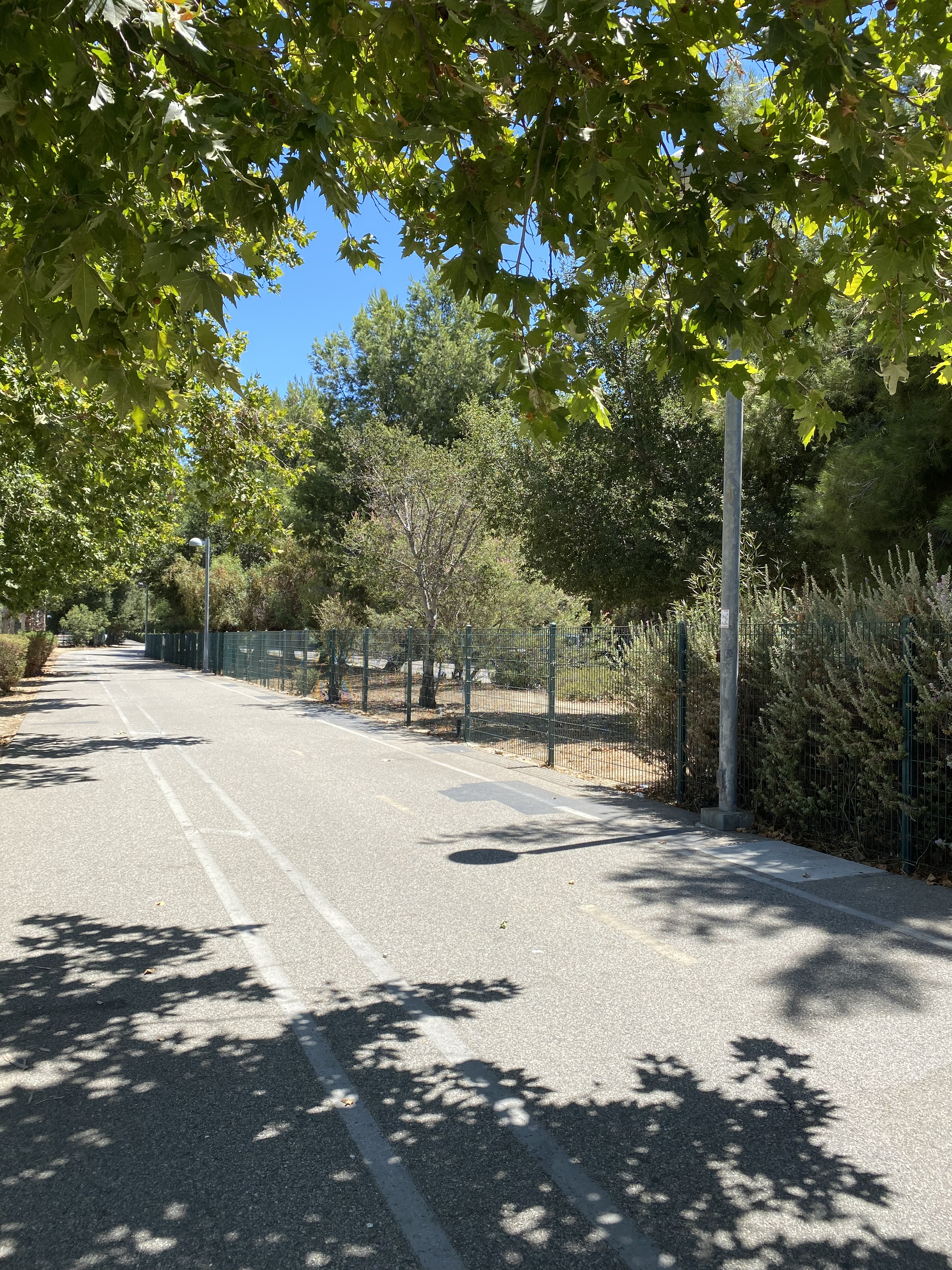
G Line Bikeway, Van Nuys

In October 2005, the Metro Orange Line opened with two stations, Van Nuys station (Los Angeles Metro) and Sepulveda station.

In 2014, a "Great Streets" project was introduced by Mayor Eric Garcetti with Van Nuys Blvd. to be redesigned between Victory Blvd. and Oxnard Street. Also, Sepulveda Blvd. was resurfaced between Victory Blvd and Oxnard Street in May 2014. A new Los Angeles County family services building was built on the southwest corner of Van Nuys Blvd. and Saticoy Street in 2016.

== Geography and climate ==
Van Nuys is bordered on the north by North Hills, on the northeast by Panorama City, on the east by Valley Glen, on the south by Sherman Oaks, on the southwest by the Sepulveda Basin, on the west by Lake Balboa, and on the northwest by Northridge. Its street and other boundaries are Roscoe Boulevard on the north, Sepulveda Boulevard, the Tujunga Wash, Woodman Avenue and Hazeltine Avenue on the east, Oxnard Street on the south, the Sepulveda Basin on the southwest and Odessa and Hayvenhurst avenues and Balboa Boulevard on the west.

=== Boundary changes ===
Some former Van Nuys neighborhoods won approval in 2009 by the Los Angeles City Council to break off from Van Nuys and join the neighboring communities of Lake Balboa, Valley Glen, and Sherman Oaks in an effort to raise their property values. City Council member Tony Cardenas "suggested the change was motivated by racism".

=== Climate ===
Climate data for Van Nuys Airport (1991–2020 normals, extremes 1949–1950, 1961–1962, 1998–present)
| Month | Jan | Feb | Mar | Apr | May | Jun | Jul | Aug | Sep | Oct | Nov | Dec | Year |
|---|---|---|---|---|---|---|---|---|---|---|---|---|---|
| Record high °F (°C) | 92 (33) | 92 (33) | 97 (36) | 101 (38) | 105 (41) | 114 (46) | 117 (47) | 112 (44) | 118 (48) | 107 (42) | 96 (36) | 89 (32) | 118 (48) |
| Mean maximum °F (°C) | 81.7 (27.6) | 82.3 (27.9) | 86.7 (30.4) | 92.7 (33.7) | 95.3 (35.2) | 99.5 (37.5) | 103.3 (39.6) | 104.7 (40.4) | 105.3 (40.7) | 97.9 (36.6) | 89.3 (31.8) | 82.1 (27.8) | 108.0 (42.2) |
| Mean daily maximum °F (°C) | 68.2 (20.1) | 68.4 (20.2) | 72.1 (22.3) | 75.3 (24.1) | 78.9 (26.1) | 84.2 (29.0) | 91.2 (32.9) | 93.1 (33.9) | 90.4 (32.4) | 82.9 (28.3) | 75.0 (23.9) | 67.4 (19.7) | 78.9 (26.1) |
| Daily mean °F (°C) | 57.2 (14.0) | 57.4 (14.1) | 60.6 (15.9) | 63.4 (17.4) | 67.5 (19.7) | 72.0 (22.2) | 77.8 (25.4) | 79.0 (26.1) | 76.6 (24.8) | 69.8 (21.0) | 62.2 (16.8) | 56.1 (13.4) | 66.6 (19.2) |
| Mean daily minimum °F (°C) | 46.1 (7.8) | 46.4 (8.0) | 49.2 (9.6) | 51.5 (10.8) | 56.1 (13.4) | 59.8 (15.4) | 64.3 (17.9) | 64.9 (18.3) | 62.7 (17.1) | 56.6 (13.7) | 49.3 (9.6) | 44.9 (7.2) | 54.3 (12.4) |
| Mean minimum °F (°C) | 35.7 (2.1) | 37.0 (2.8) | 40.2 (4.6) | 42.9 (6.1) | 49.2 (9.6) | 54.5 (12.5) | 58.7 (14.8) | 59.3 (15.2) | 55.1 (12.8) | 49.3 (9.6) | 40.0 (4.4) | 34.6 (1.4) | 33.1 (0.6) |
| Record low °F (°C) | 22 (−6) | 27 (−3) | 32 (0) | 36 (2) | 38 (3) | 46 (8) | 50 (10) | 47 (8) | 45 (7) | 35 (2) | 31 (−1) | 28 (−2) | 22 (−6) |
| Average precipitation inches (mm) | 2.75 (70) | 3.79 (96) | 2.50 (64) | 0.71 (18) | 0.29 (7.4) | 0.07 (1.8) | 0.00 (0.00) | 0.01 (0.25) | 0.12 (3.0) | 0.48 (12) | 0.75 (19) | 1.95 (50) | 13.42 (341) |
| Average precipitation days | 5.1 | 6.4 | 5.3 | 3.0 | 1.5 | 0.4 | 0.1 | 0.1 | 0.6 | 2.4 | 3.4 | 5.6 | 33.9 |
Source: NOAA

== Population ==
The 2000 U.S. census counted 136,443 residents in the 8.99-square-mile Van Nuys neighborhood—or 11,542 people per square mile. In 2000, the median age for residents was 28, considered young for city and county neighborhoods, and the percentages of residents aged 10 or younger and 19 to 34 were among the highest in Los Angeles County.

The neighborhood was considered "moderately diverse" ethnically within Los Angeles. The breakdown was Hispanics, 60.5%; whites, 23.1%; Asians, 6.4%; blacks, 6%; and others, 4%. Mexico (41.5%) and El Salvador (17.3%) were the most common places of birth for the 49.8% of the residents who were born abroad—a high percentage for Los Angeles. There were 4,917 families headed by single parents or 21.3%, considered high for both the city and the county.

The median yearly household income in 2008 dollars was $41,134, considered average for the city, but low for the county. The percentages of households that earned $40,000 or less were high for the county. Renters occupied 73.9% of the housing stock, and house- or apartment-owners held 26.1%.

== Economy ==
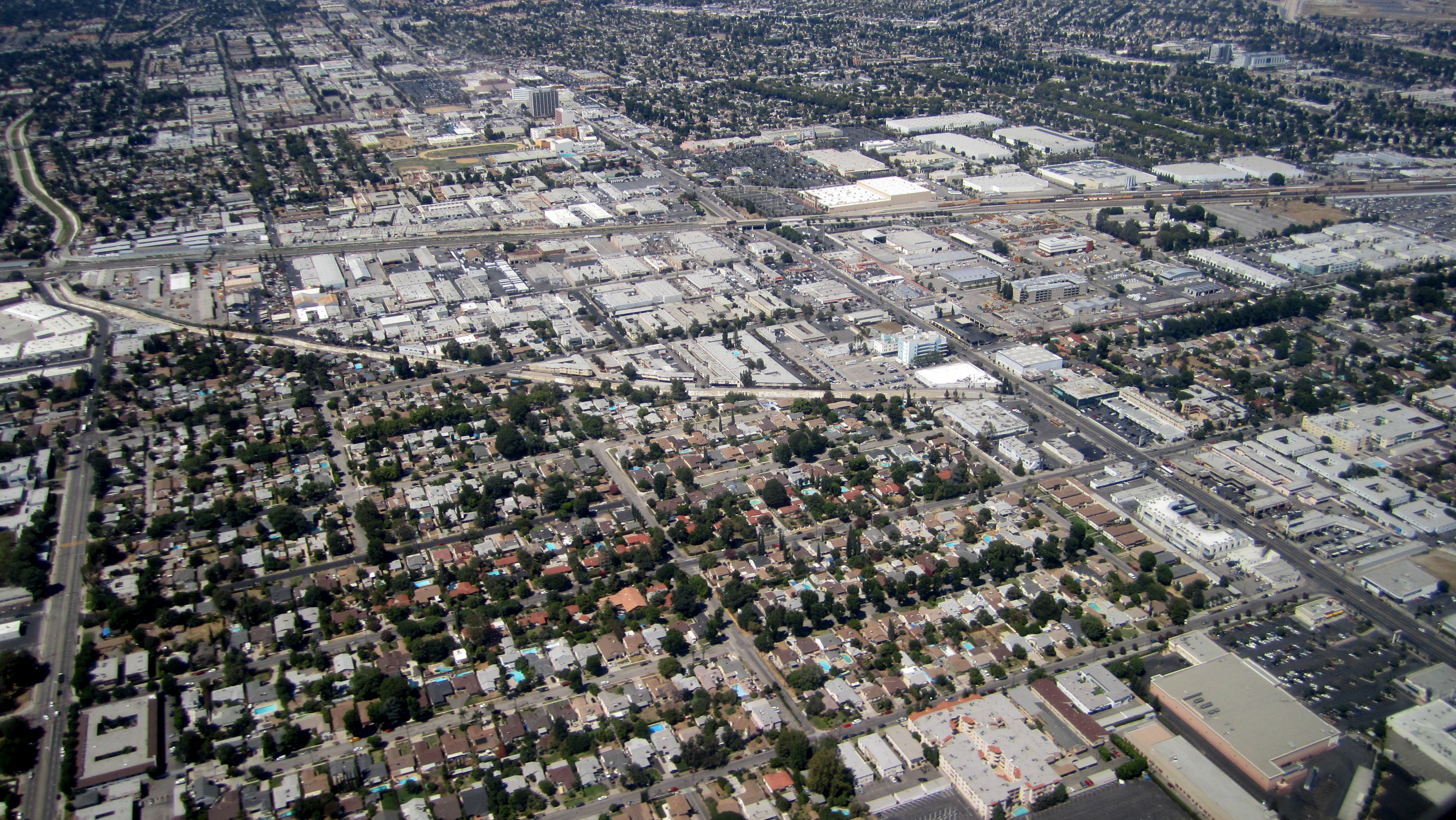
Industry in Van Nuys

Van Nuys Boulevard has a long and diverse commercial district along it, as do other major streets crossing through Van Nuys.

From December 1947 until August 1992, General Motors operated an automobile factory called Van Nuys Assembly at Van Nuys Boulevard and Arminta Street to augment production efforts at their South Gate Assembly factory, which opened in 1936. The Van Nuys plant manufactured 6.3 million vehicles, including the Chevrolet Impala, Corvair, and later was the primary location for the Nova, Camaro, and Pontiac Firebird. Other models built were the Chevrolet Monte Carlo, Chevelle, the Oldsmobile Omega, and the Pontiac Ventura. Badge engineered versions of the Impala, Nova and Camaro were also manufactured at this location. In October 1989, GM announced that Camaro and Firebird production would be moved to a facility in Sainte-Thérèse. Due to air quality remediation efforts and decreasing market share of GM products, the factory was closed.

In 1999, The Plant shopping center opened on the former factory site, anchored by big box retailers and a 16-screen movie theater multiplex. Through the following years there were additions to The Plant shopping center.

Sound City Studios is a recording studio in Van Nuys. Van Nuys, along with Chatsworth, is home to numerous pornographic film studios, distributors, and manufacturers.

Grupo TACA operates a Van Nuys-area TACA Center at 6710 Van Nuys Boulevard.

Various parts of the 1984 film The Terminator were filmed in Van Nuys.

== Government services ==
Victory Boulevard (Eastbound toward the City of Burbank) at Sylmar Avenue

The Los Angeles Fire Department operates Station 39 (Van Nuys), Station 90 Van Nuys Airport Area, Station 100 West Van Nuys, and Station 102 East Van Nuys, serving the community.

The Los Angeles Police Department operates the nearby Van Nuys Community Police Station at 6420 Sylmar Avenue, 91401, serving the neighborhood.

The United States Postal Service operates the Civic Center Van Nuys Post Office at 6200 Van Nuys Boulevard in Van Nuys (closed and moved outside the Van Nuys civic center to 6531 Van Nuys Blvd, Van Nuys, CA 91401) and the Van Nuys Post Office at 15701 Sherman Way in the Lake Balboa neighborhood in Los Angeles, west of Van Nuys.

Los Angeles Animal Services operates the East Valley animal shelter in Van Nuys.

The U.S. Census Bureau operates the Los Angeles Regional Office in Van Nuys.

The California Department of Developmental Services operates the North Los Angeles County Regional Center on Sherman Way west of Sepulveda Boulevard, but they closed that location and moved to a new location on Oakhurst and Plummer in Chatsworth in 2016. The agency serves a large population of developmentally disabled people living in the San Fernando Valley.

The Social Security Administration once operated a branch office on Van Nuys Boulevard north of Victory Boulevard in Van Nuys. This location was closed in 2011, and moved to Panorama City on Roscoe Blvd and Van Nuys Blvd.

== Parks ==
The Van Nuys Recreation Area is in Van Nuys. The area has an auditorium and gymnasium with a capacity of 420 people, and a multipurpose/community room with a capacity of 20–25 people. The area has barbecue pits, lighted baseball diamonds, lighted outdoor basketball courts, a children's play area, a community room, lighted handball courts, an indoor gymnasium with no weights, picnic tables, a lighted soccer field, and lighted tennis courts.

Delano Park in Van Nuys has an auditorium, barbecue pits, a lighted baseball diamond, a children's play area, a lighted football field, an indoor gymnasium with no weights, picnic tables, and a lighted soccer field.

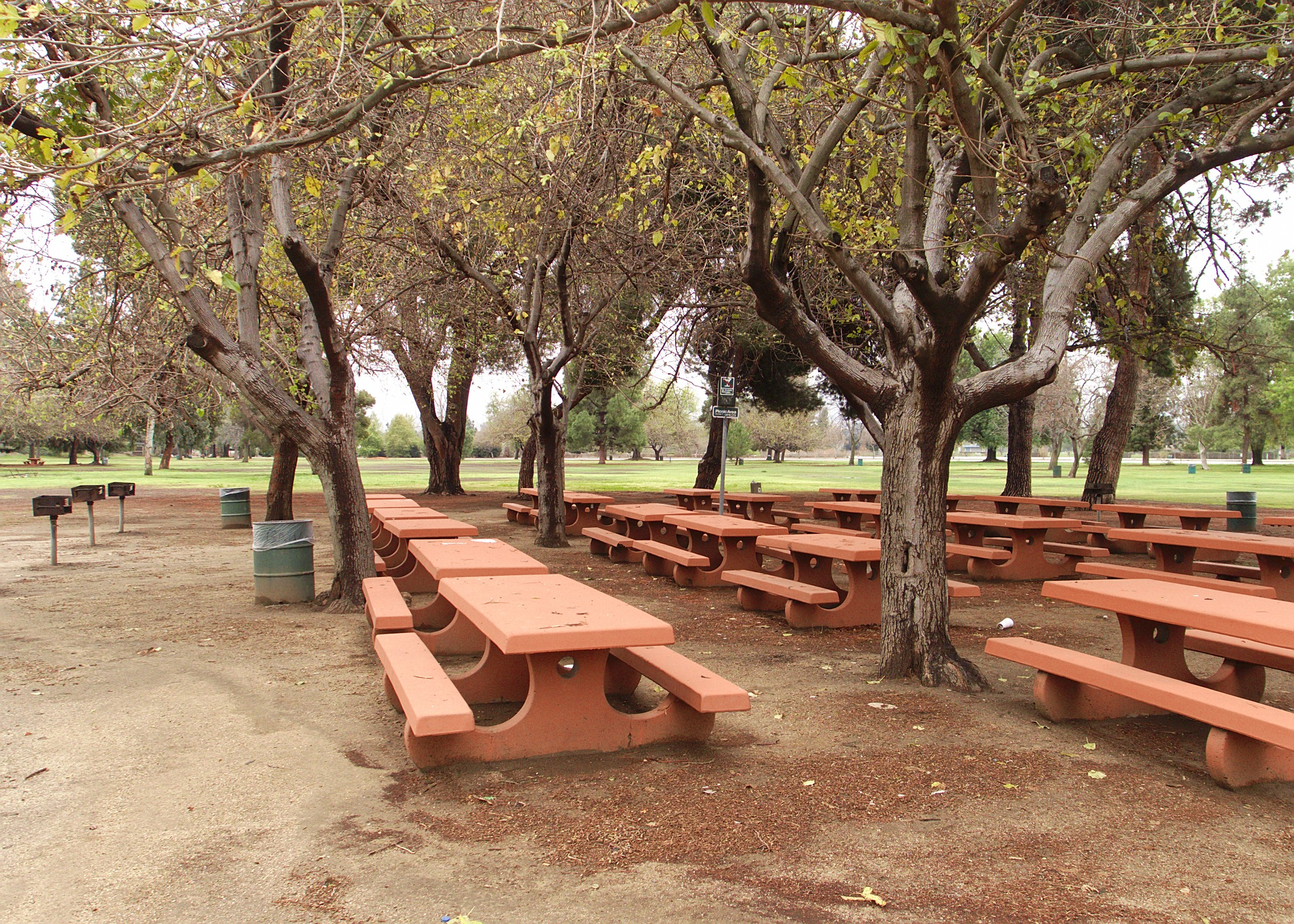
Woodley Park picnic area

The Van Nuys adjacent Sepulveda Basin Recreation Area to the west is a large open space park behind Sepulveda Dam. The Metro Orange Line bicycle path connects Van Nuys to it and other valley destinations. It has numerous recreation facilities and natural areas, including a wildlife preserve, cricket complex, and archery range at Woodley Park.

The Van Nuys Sherman Oaks Park is in Sherman Oaks, near Van Nuys. The park has an auditorium, two lighted baseball diamonds, six unlighted baseball diamonds, lighted indoor basketball courts, lighted outdoor basketball courts, a children's play area, a 60-person community room, a lighted football field, an indoor gymnasium without weights, picnic tables, a lighted soccer field, and lighted tennis courts. Located in the same place as the park, the Van Nuys Sherman Oaks Pool is a seasonal outdoor heated swimming pool. The Van Nuys Sherman Oaks Senior Citizen Center (a.k.a. Bernardi Center), also on the park grounds, has an auditorium and multi-purpose room. The senior community hall also has two community/meeting rooms, two kitchens, a play area, a shuffle board area, a stage, and two storage rooms. The Van Nuys Sherman Oaks Tennis Courts facility in the Van Nuys Sherman Oaks Park has eight courts.

== Education ==
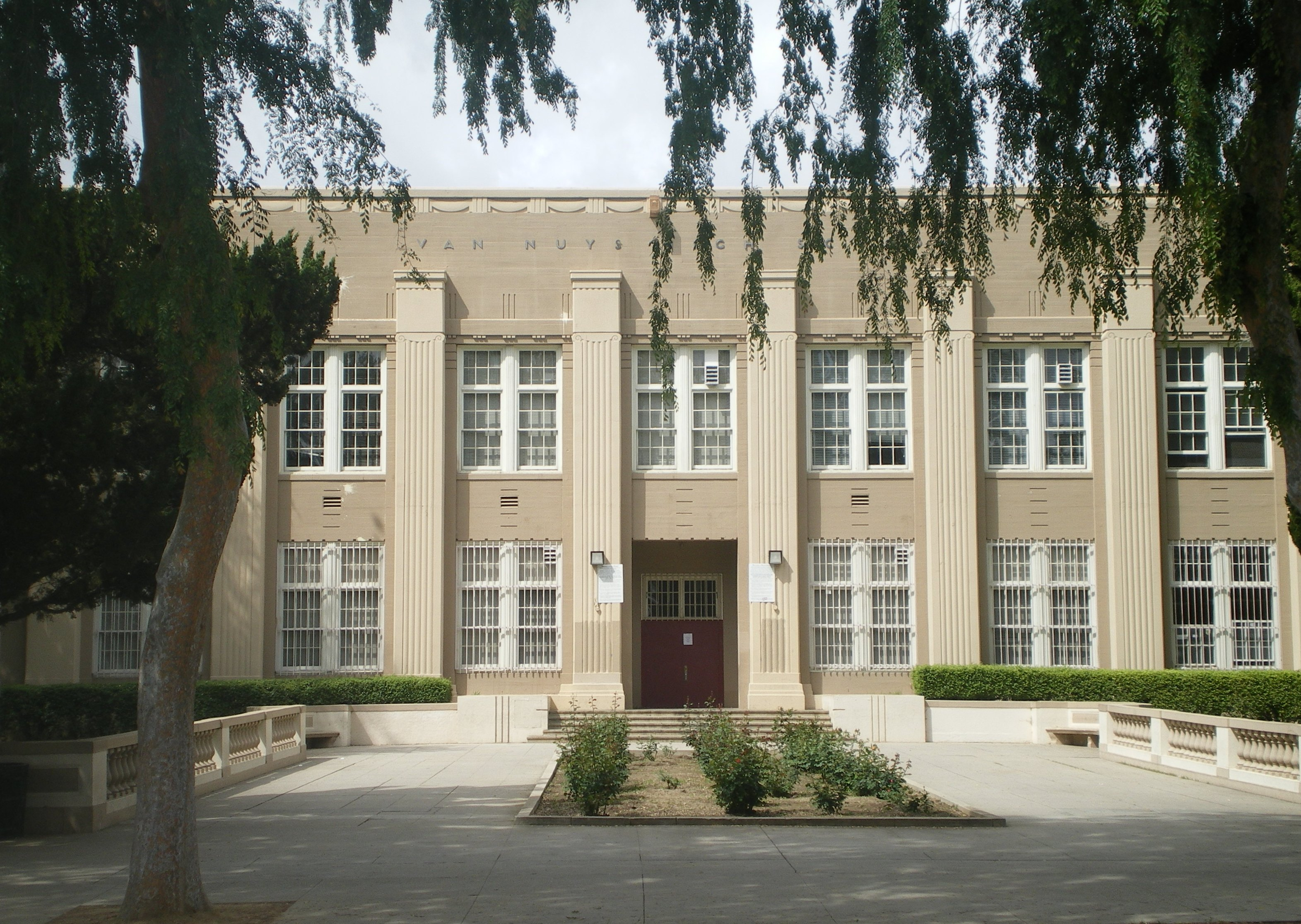
Van Nuys High School

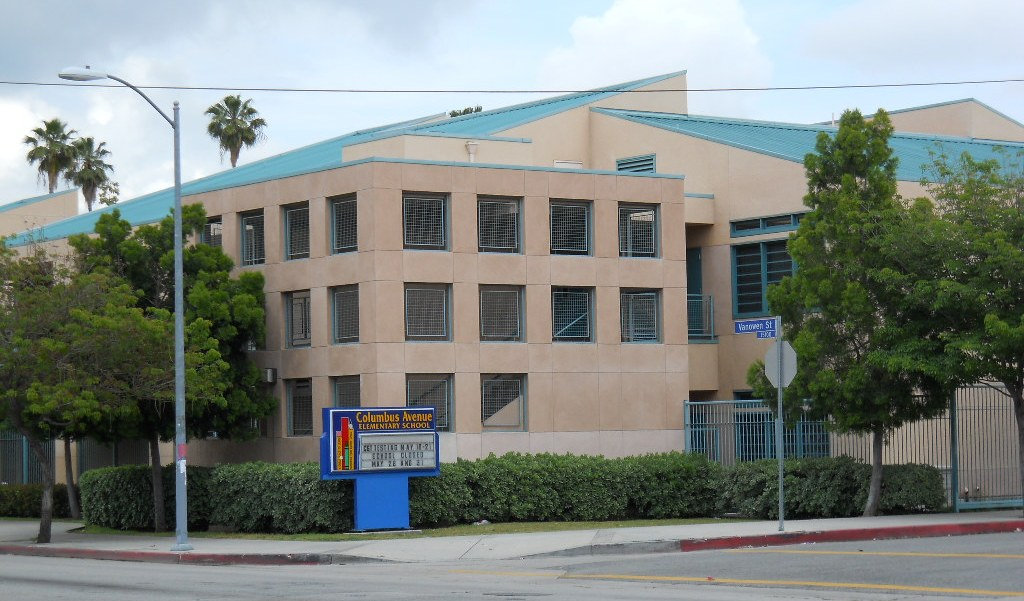
Columbus Avenue Elementary School

Fifteen percent of Van Nuys residents aged 25 and older had earned a four-year degree by 2000, an average figure for both the city and the county, but the percentage of the same-age residents who had less than a high school diploma (43.1%) was high for Los Angeles.

Schools within the Van Nuys boundaries are:

=== Public ===
The Los Angeles Unified School District operates neighborhood public schools:

- Kittridge Street Elementary School, 13619 Kittridge Street
- Van Nuys Senior High School, 6535 Cedros Avenue
- Cohasset Street Elementary School, 15810 Saticoy Street
- Robert Fulton College Preparatory School, 7477 Kester Avenue
- Valerio Street Elementary School, 15035 Valerio Street
- Hazeltine Avenue Elementary School, 7150 Hazeltine Avenue
- Columbus Avenue Elementary School, 6700 Columbus Avenue
- Van Nuys Elementary School, 6464 Sylmar Avenue
- Will Rogers Continuation School, 14711 Gilmore Street
- Sylvan Park Elementary School, 6238 Noble Avenue
- Van Nuys Adult School, 6535 Cedros Avenue
- NVOC- Aviation Center, 16550 Saticoy Street

Charter schools include:

- Charter High School of Arts — Multimedia and Performing, 6952 Van Nuys Boulevard

Van Nuys Middle School was moved into Sherman Oaks in 1991. The school continues to use the name "Van Nuys" despite the move.

=== Private ===
- Pacific Ridge School, 15339 Saticoy Street
- Crossroads School, 6843 Lennox Avenue
- St. Elisabeth School, elementary, 6635 Tobias Avenue
- Grace Christian Academy, 6510 Peach Avenue
- The Crawford Academy, 14530 Sylvan Street
- Children's Community School, 14702 Sylvan Street
- Montclair College Prep, 8071 Sepulveda Boulevard, has closed.
- Lycée International de Los Angeles previously operated a campus in Van Nuys.

== Public libraries ==
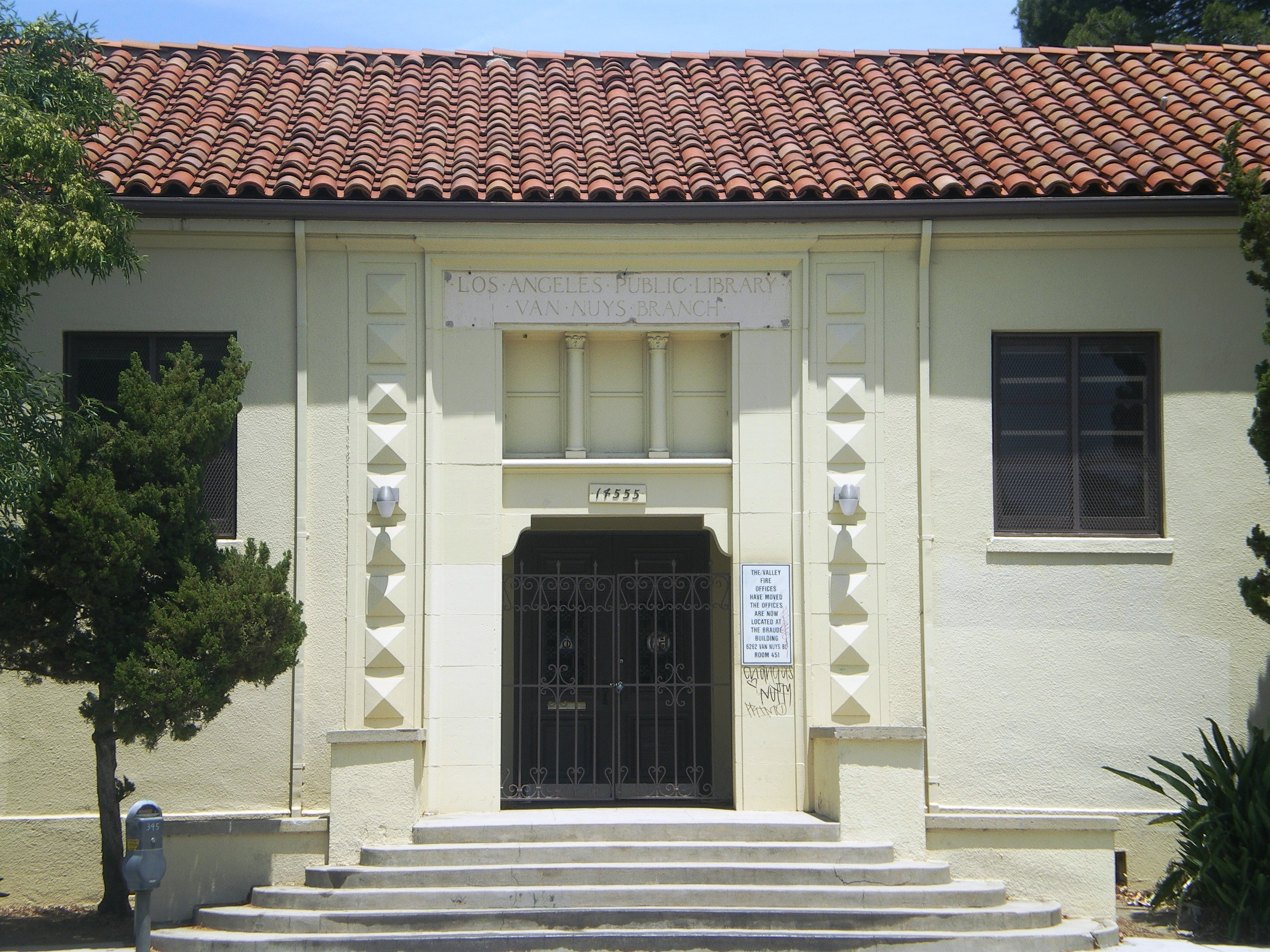
Original Van Nuys Branch Library (1927)

The Van Nuys Branch Library of the Los Angeles Public Library serves the community.

== Transportation ==
=== Air ===
Van Nuys Airport is located in Van Nuys.

The closest airport with commercial airline service is Hollywood Burbank Airport in Burbank. It can be accessed via Amtrak and Metrolink service, or by Amtrak Thruway 1C daily bus connections, from Van Nuys station.

The FlyAway bus service travels hourly from its terminal at Woodley and Saticoy Avenues to Los Angeles International Airport (LAX).

=== Public transit ===
Van Nuys has two Metro G Line stations: the Van Nuys (Los Angeles Metro station) and the Sepulveda (Los Angeles Metro station). The G Line connects to the Metro B Line subway at the North Hollywood (Los Angeles Metro station), for access to Hollywood, Downtown Los Angeles, and other Los Angeles Metro lines. The Metro Busway also uses the Van Nuys station. All stations, and the neighborhood's major streets, are served by Metro Local, Metro Rapid, and/or other bus lines and systems. The Metro G Line bicycle path and pedestrian walkway runs in a landscaped zone alongside the entire route, to Pierce College, Canoga Park, and the Chatsworth Station on the west, and North Hollywood on the east.

Van Nuys also has Amtrak and Metrolink service at Van Nuys station. It is served by the Amtrak Pacific Surfliner and Coast Starlight, and the Metrolink Ventura County Line. The Amtrak Thruway 1C provides daily connections from Van Nuys station to Santa Monica and Westwood/UCLA to the south, Burbank Airport to the east, and Newhall and Bakersfield to the north.

Van Nuys Boulevard is the planned route for the East San Fernando Valley Light Rail Transit Project, scheduled to open by 2031, with its southern terminus at the Van Nuys G Line station and a station at the Van Nuys Metrolink Station.

=== Freeways ===
Van Nuys is served by the 405 (San Diego Freeway) passing through it.

Other nearby freeways include the Route 101 (Ventura Freeway), the Route 170 (Hollywood Freeway), the Route 118 (Simi Valley Freeway), and the Golden State Freeway section of Interstate 5.

== Healthcare ==
Valley Presbyterian Hospital is a 350-bed hospital at 15107 Vanowen St, Van Nuys, Los Angeles, CA 91405. It was founded in 1958 and initially designed by noted architect William Pereira. It has 350 beds, as well as an emergency room which can handle pediatric patients. Also in Van Nuys is the Southern California Hospital, at 14433 Emelita St, which is a psychiatric facility that provides no emergency services. The nearest Kaiser Permanente hospital to Van Nuys is Kaiser Panorama City Medical Center.

== Notable people ==
- George O. Abell (1927–1983), astronomer, professor
- Ernani Bernardi (1911–2006), musician and member of the Los Angeles City Council, 1961–1993
- Joseph V. Brennan, auxiliary bishop of Los Angeles
- Julie Brown, actress
- Brian Patrick Butler, actor and filmmaker
- Steve Daines, U.S. senator from Montana
- Kerry Lyn Dalton, murderer
- Andy Devine, actor, honorary mayor from 1938 to 1957
- Don Drysdale, Hall of Fame baseball player
- Michael Erush (born 1984), soccer player and coach
- Mike Fetters, baseball pitcher and coach
- Laurence D. Fink, financier
- Brian Austin Green, actor
- Camryn Grimes, actress
- Robert Harland, actor
- Chris Holdsworth, UFC fighter
- Michael Hunter, professional boxer
- Brody King, professional wrestler and musician
- Michael Landau, musician
- Jon Locke, western television actor
- Gary Lockwood, actor
- Delamere Francis McCloskey, Los Angeles City Council member, 1941–43
- Matthew Mercer, voice actor
- Ken Michelman, actor
- Kevin Mitnick, convicted hacker
- Matt Moore, professional football player
- Neal Morse, singer-songwriter, multi-instrumentalist, bandleader and progressive rock composer
- Tony Muser, Major League Baseball player and manager
- Chris O'Loughlin (born 1967), Olympic fencer
- Johnny Parsons, Indy 500 qualifier
- Thano Rama, actor
- Robert Redford, actor, director, producer
- Jake Richardson, actor
- Shorty Rogers, jazz musician and arranger
- Rose Marie, actress and comedian
- Jane Russell, actress
- Herbert Ryman, artist and Disney Imagineer
- Nikki Sixx, musician
- Bob Walk, baseball player and broadcaster
- Diane Warren, songwriter
- Bob Waterfield, professional football player
- Brooke White, singer, American Idol Season 7 finalist
- Hobart Johnstone Whitley, real-estate developer
- Cindy Williams, actress
- Natalie Wood, actress
- Todd Zeile, professional baseball player

== Notable places ==
- Van Nuys Boulevard
- Van Nuys City Hall
- Galpin Auto Sports – Pimp My Ride (seasons 5 and 6)
- Busch Gardens theme park (1964–1979), demolished
- Sound City Studios
- Valley Relics Museum
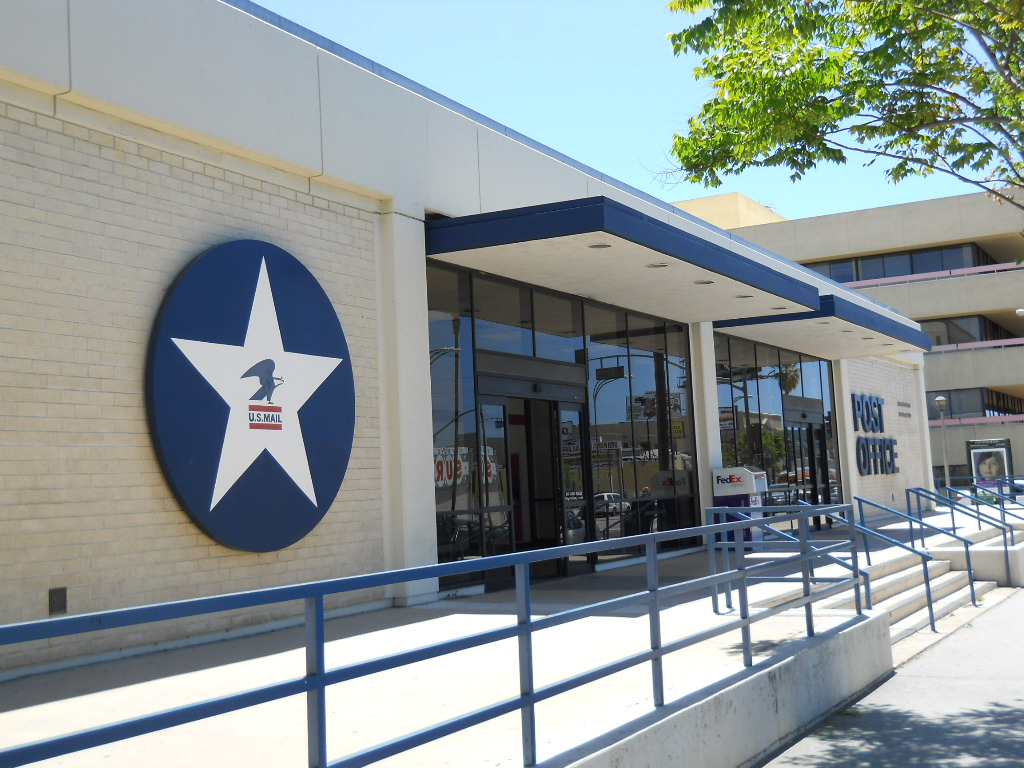
Van Nuys Post Office

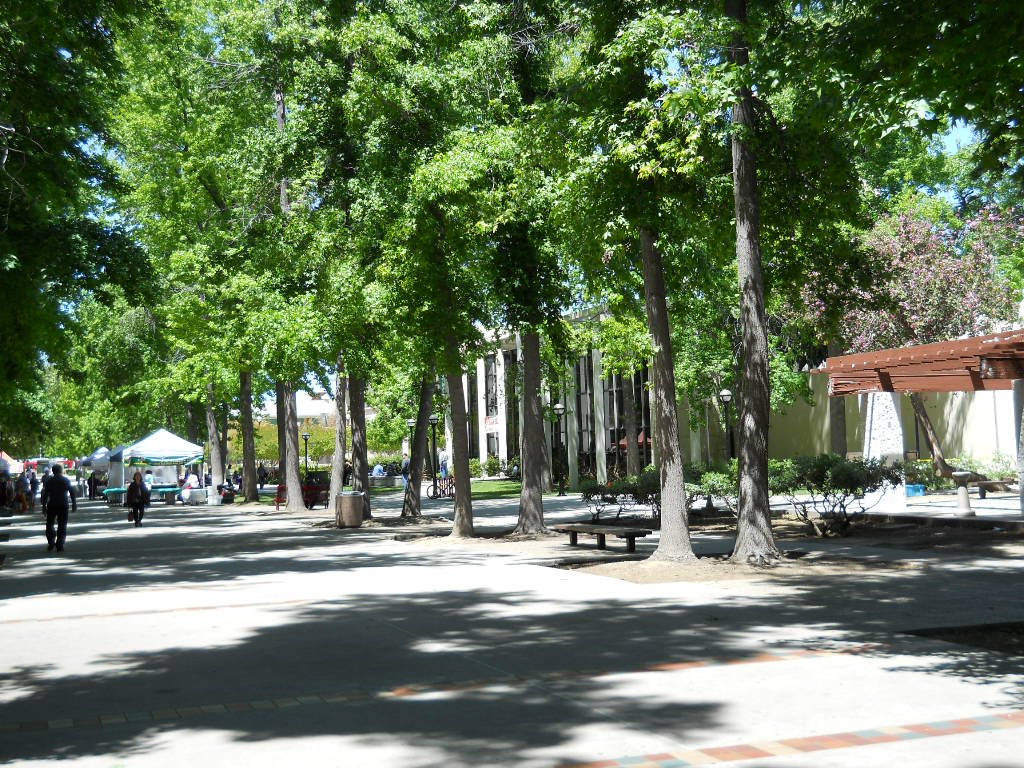
Erwin Street Pedestrian Mall in Government Center

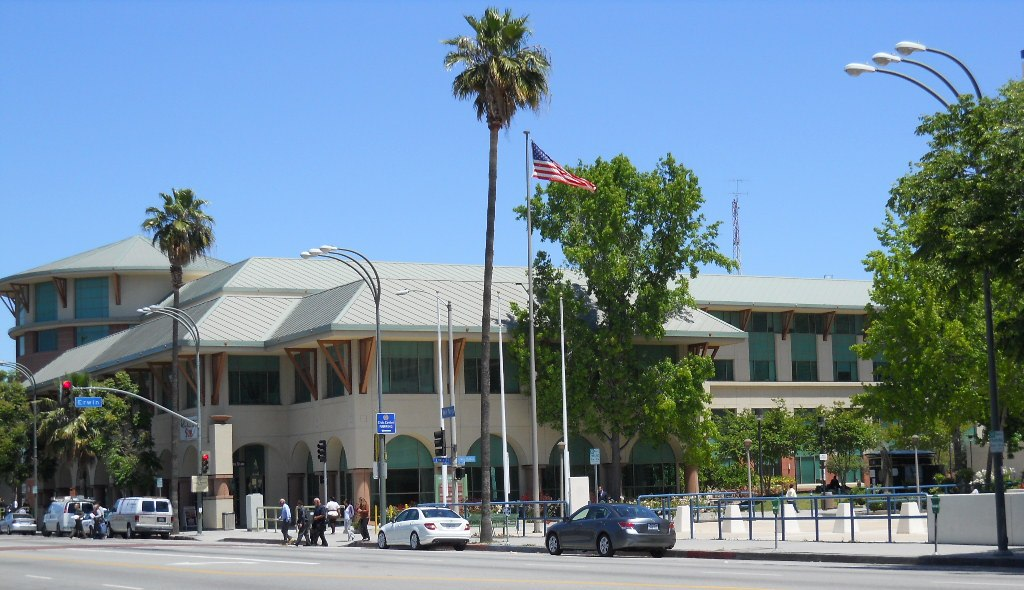
Government Center, Van Nuys Boulevard and Erwin Street

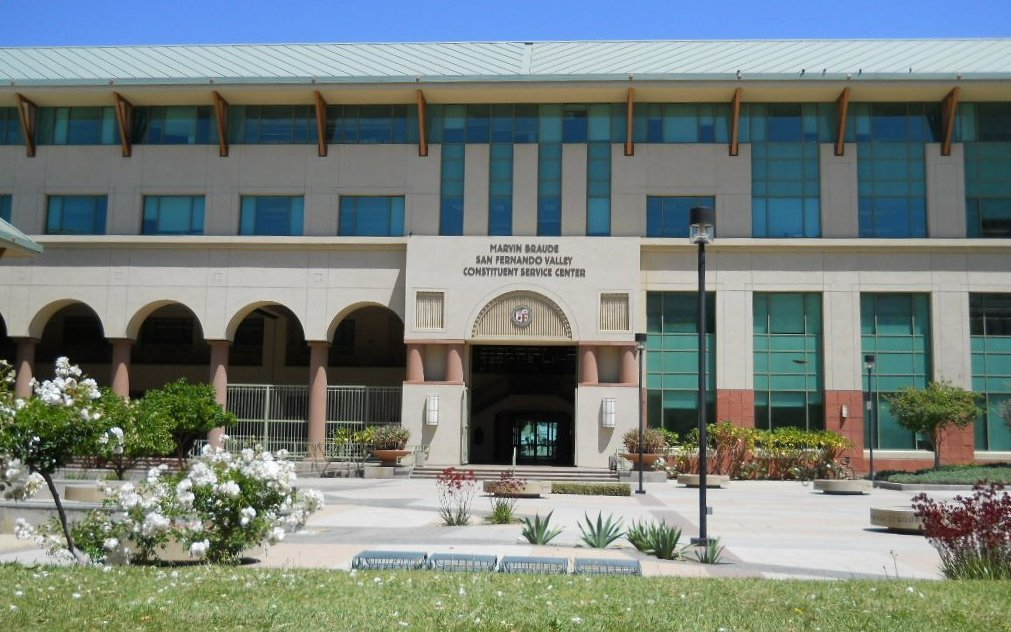
Marvin Braude San Fernando Valley Constituent Service Center, at Government Center

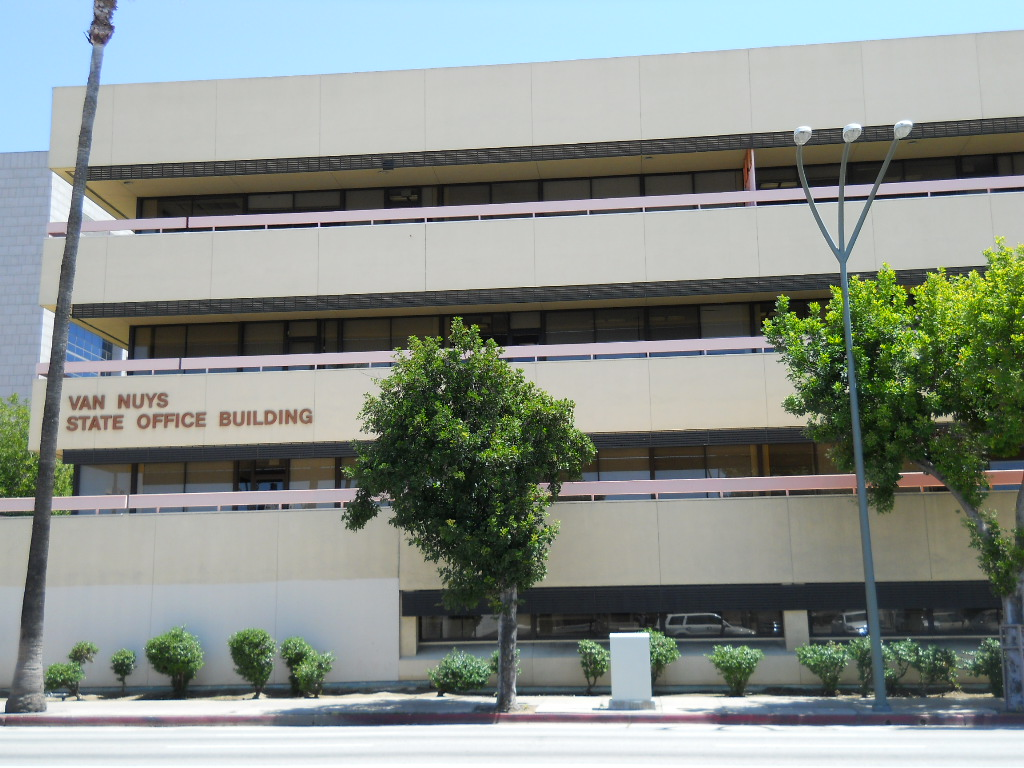
Van Nuys State Office Building at Government Center

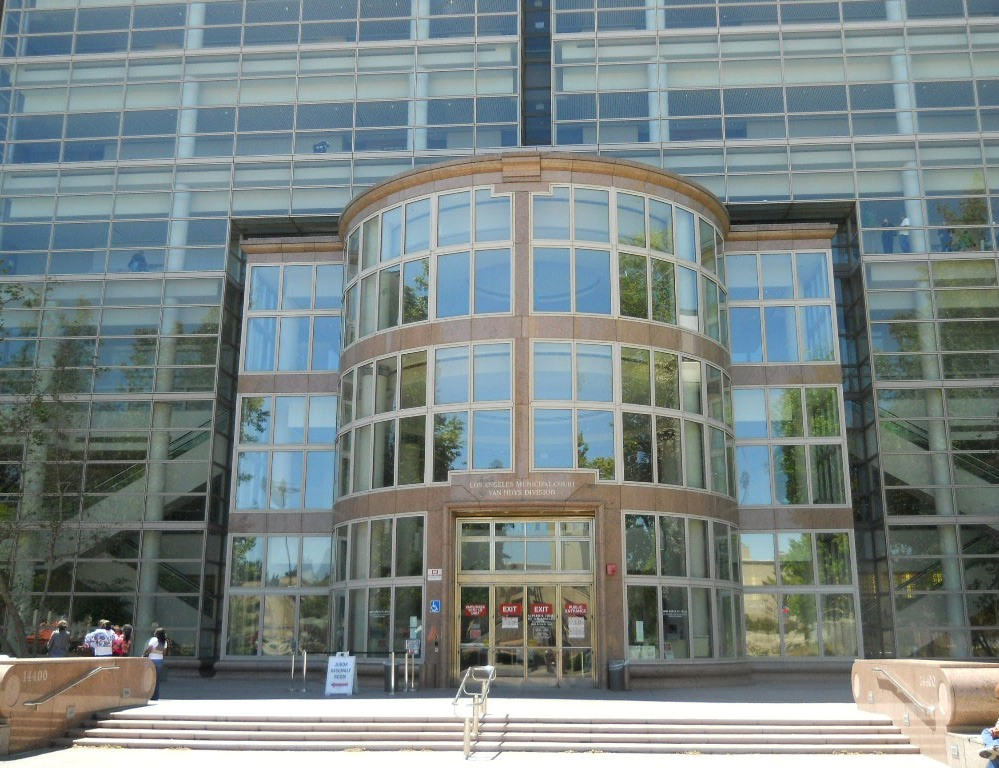
Los Angeles Superior Court, Van Nuys Division, at Government Center

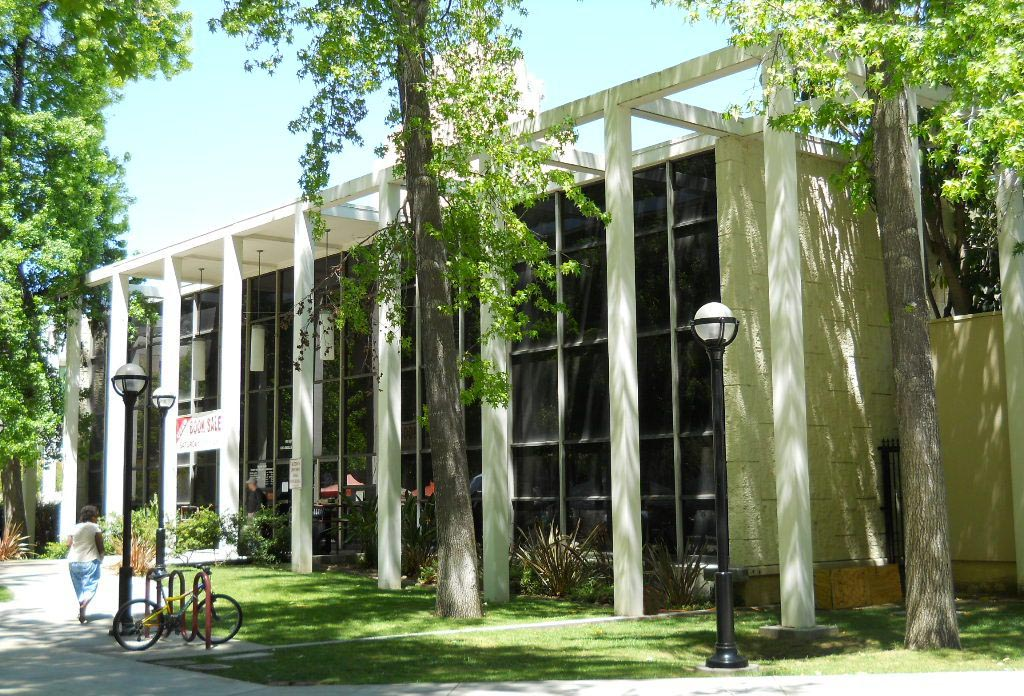
New Van Nuys Branch, Los Angeles Public Library, Sylmar Avenue Mall

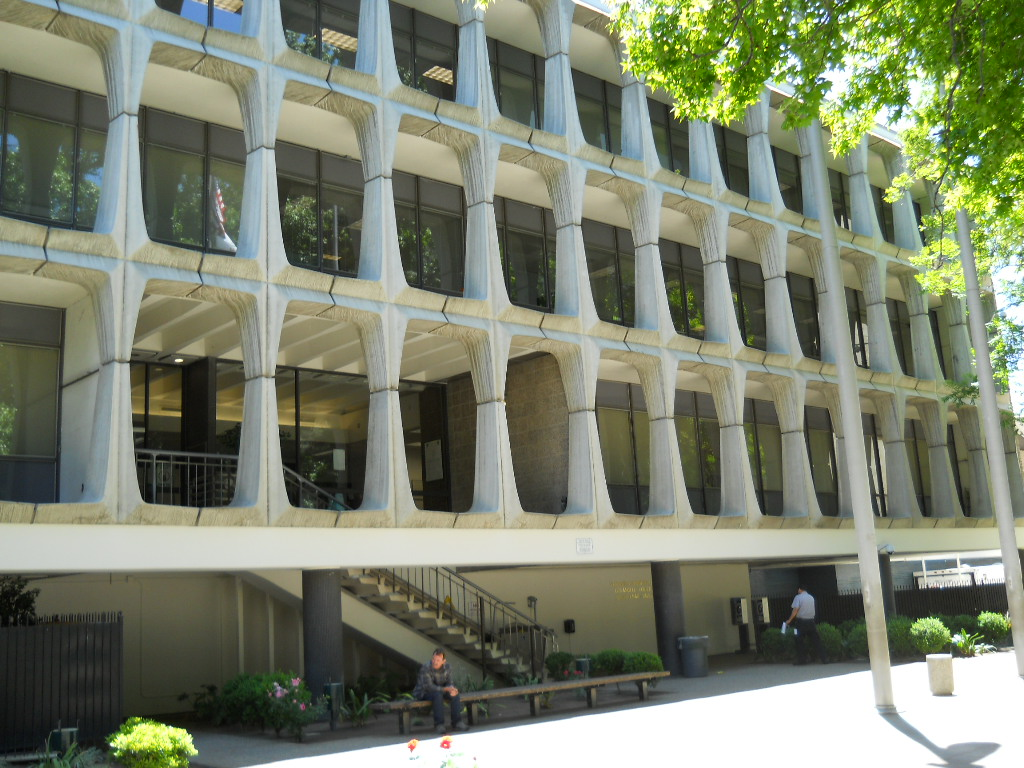
Van Nuys Community Police Station, 6240 Sylmar Avenue Mall

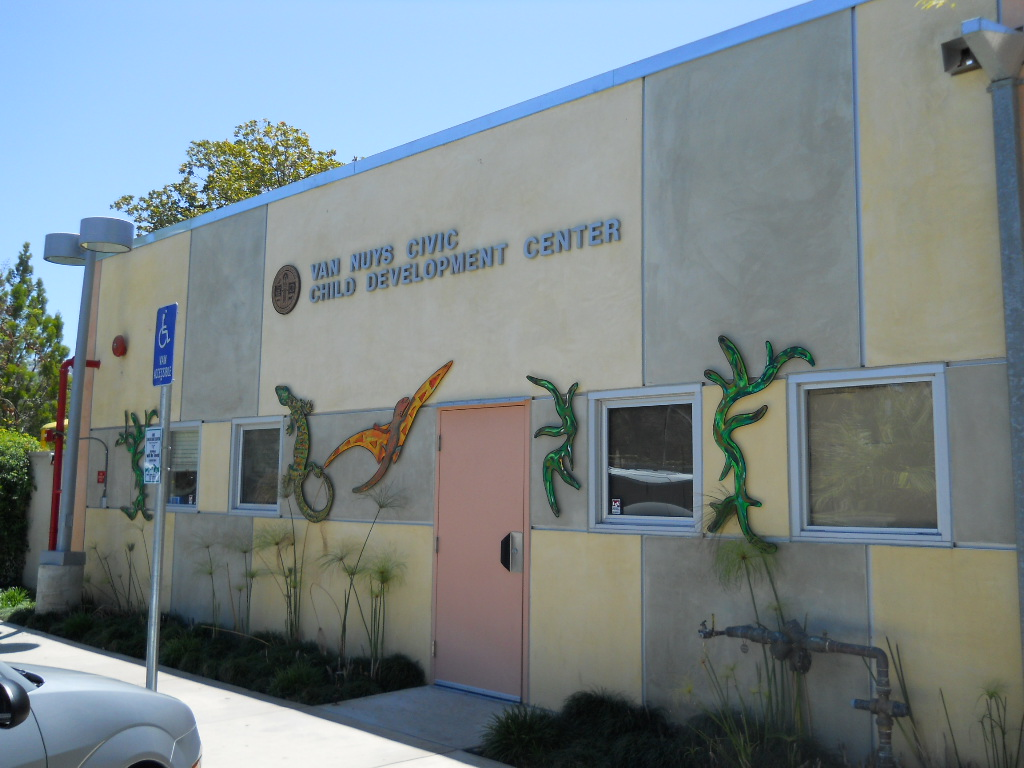
Van Nuys Civic Child Development Center

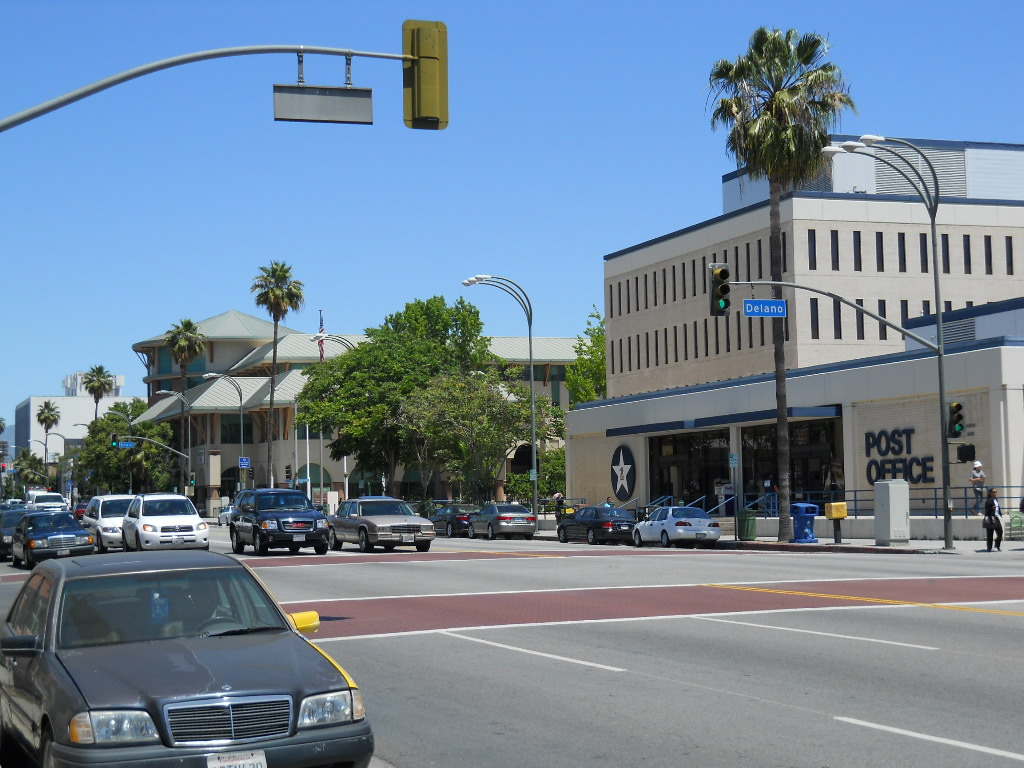
Van Nuys Boulevard and Delano St.

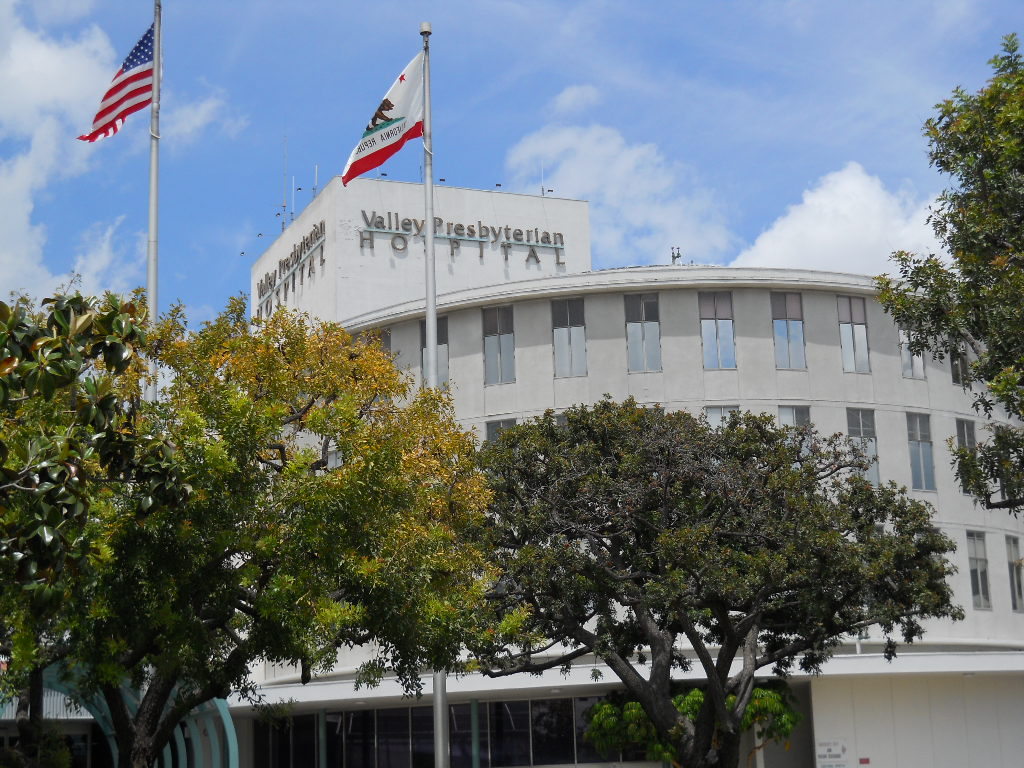
Valley Presbyterian Hospital

== See also ==
- History of the San Fernando Valley
