= Alton A. Lessard =

American judge

Chief Justice of the Maine Superior Court
- In office August 24, 1965 – August 2, 1974

United States Attorney for the District of Maine
- In office 1961–1965
- President: John F. Kennedy; Lyndon B. Johnson
- Preceded by: Peter Mills
- Succeeded by: William E. McKinley Jr.
- In office July 21, 1947 – August 16, 1953
- President: Harry S. Truman; Dwight D. Eisenhower
- Preceded by: Edward J. Harrington
- Succeeded by: Peter Mills

Member of the Maine Senate from the 4th district
- In office January 5, 1955 – January 4, 1961
- Preceded by: Mary L. Kavanagh
- Succeeded by: Paul A. Couture

Personal details
- Born: Alton Adolor Lessard; August 2, 1909 Rumford, Maine, U.S.
- Died: June 3, 1976 (aged 66) Falmouth, Maine, U.S.
- Party: Democratic
- Spouse: Atala Mary Lamar (m. 1930)
- Education: Georgetown University (LLB)

Alton Adolor Lessard (August 2, 1909 – June 3, 1976) was a Superior Court justice credited as being “one of the architects in the rejuvenation of the Democratic Party in Maine” (He was as chairman of the Democratic State Committee when Edmund Muskie was elected to the US Senate, the first Democrat in 40 years).

Lessard also served two terms as Mayor of Lewiston, Maine. Lessard also served in the Maine State Senate, and U.S. Attorney.

== See also ==
- List of mayors of Lewiston, Maine
