= Romeo T. Boisvert =

American politician (1916–1981)

Romeo T. Boisvert (November 15, 1916 – November 24, 1981) was an American politician from Maine. A prominent Democrat, Boisvert served 12 years in the Maine Senate from Androscoggin County. He also served as Mayor of his hometown of Lewiston, Maine and in the Maine House of Representatives. While in the Senate, Boisvert served at different times as both the Assistant Minority Leader and Assistant Majority Leader.

== Personal ==
Boisvert was born on November 15, 1916, in Saint-Adrien, Quebec to Theophile and Beatrice Boisvert. The Boisvert family moved to Lewiston, Maine in 1917, where he resided for the rest of his life.

== See also ==
- List of mayors of Lewiston, Maine
