= Robert E. Macdonald =

American mayor

Robert Macdonald

Mayor of Lewiston
- In office January 4, 2012 – January 2, 2018
- Preceded by: Larry Gilbert
- Succeeded by: Shane D. Bouchard

Personal details
- Born: May 4, 1947 (age 79) Boston, Massachusetts, U.S.
- Party: Republican
- Spouse: Virginia Macdonald
- Children: 4
- Education: Northeastern University

Robert Macdonald is an American politician and the former mayor of Lewiston, Maine. He was first elected in 2011, and reelected in 2013 and 2015.

Macdonald, a Vietnam War veteran and former police detective, made opposition to welfare a centerpiece of his mayoral tenure.

== See also ==
- List of mayors of Lewiston, Maine
