= Dearden's =

Defunct department store based in Los Angeles

- Industry: Retail
- Founded: 1909
- Defunct: 2017
- Headquarters: Los Angeles, California, United States
- Area served: Greater Los Angeles
- Products: Furniture

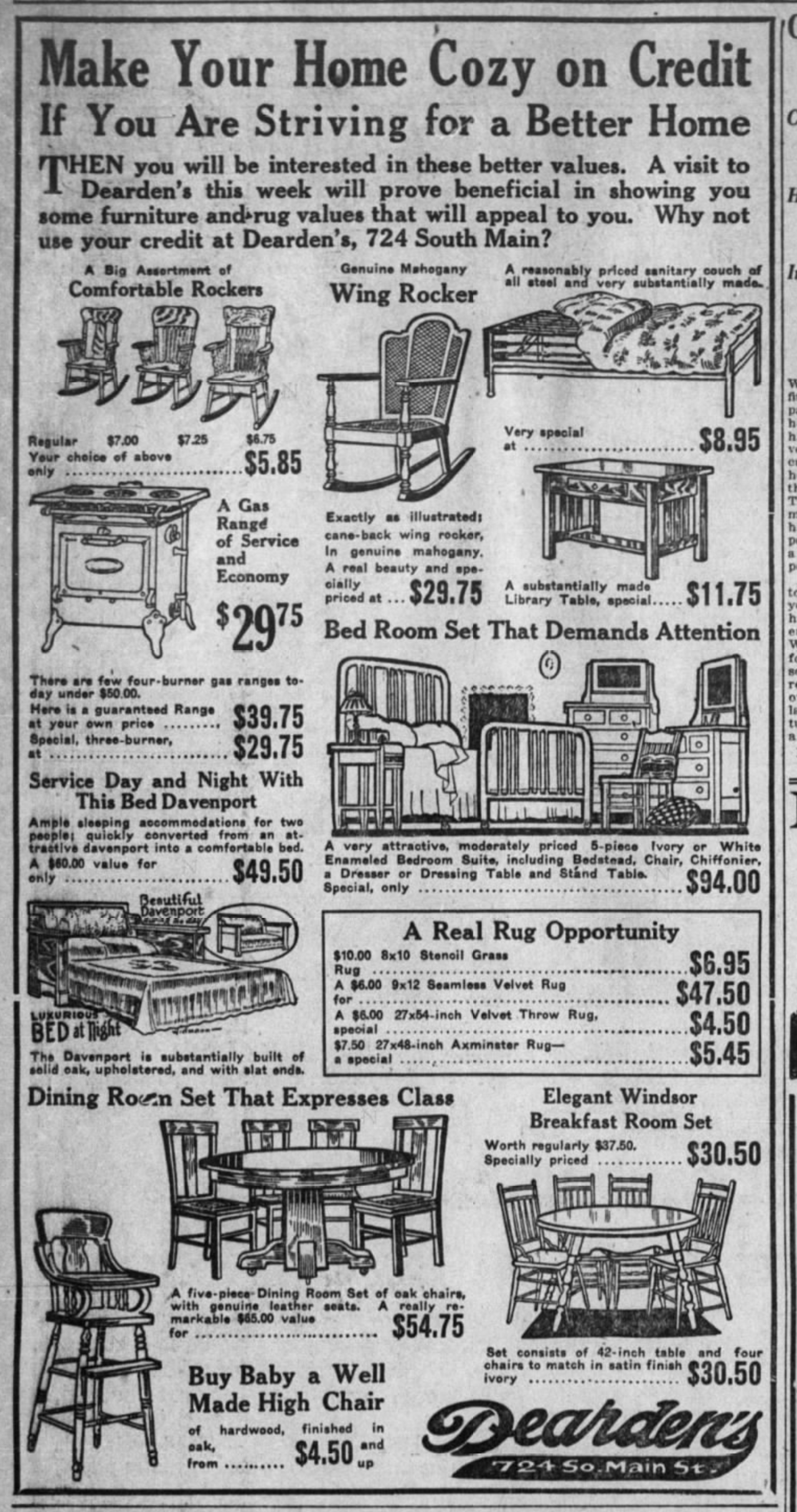
Dearden's newspaper ad, 1920

Dearden's was a chain of department stores based in Los Angeles that operated for 108 years. It was founded in 1909 by Edgar Dearden, an immigrant from England. Dearden's sold furniture, appliances, cookware, other home goods, jewelry watches, and perfume. It also provided services such as check cashing, travel planning, tax preparation and bill paying. In its last decades, it targeted lower-income Latino clients, especially immigrants from Mexico, Guatemala, Honduras and El Salvador. Dearden's offered its own credit, which it extended to many Latino immigrant customers for whom it was the first credit, and for many of whom it was difficult to get regular credit cards. For some undocumented immigrants in the 1990s, documents from Dearden's established that they were present in the country and helped in the process of receiving amnesty in order to become legal residents of the U.S.

The flagship was at 700 S. Main Street (Los Angeles), with five stories and 150,000 square feet (14,000 m^{2}). In 2006 the chain had sales of $100 million (~$145 million in 2023).

In its last decades the Dearden's jingle proclaimed on its commercials on Spanish-language television: "Dearden's, es la tienda más grande, al servicio de usted" ("Dearden's is the largest store at your service").

At the time it closed, it had 420 employees and branch locations, including many area Latino strongholds, in Anaheim, Chino, Commerce, Huntington Park, La Puente, Santa Ana, and Van Nuys. The Van Nuys store at 6609 Van Nuys Boulevard was originally a location of Butler Brothers Department Stores, opened in 1951.
