= Butler Brothers =

Retailer and wholesale supplier based in Chicago

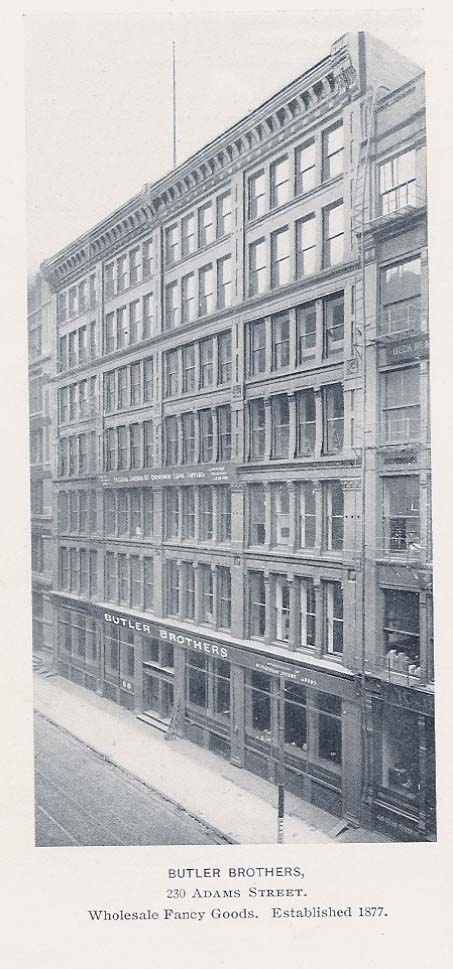
- Butler Brothers store in Chicago (c. 1900)
- Founded: 1877; United States
- Founder: Charles Hamblet Butler; George H. Butler; Edward Burgess Butler
- Fate: Active in California and Oregon in 1910-present
- Headquarters: United States,
- Number of locations: Lakeport, California, United States (1910-present); Newberg, Oregon, United States (1910-present)
- Area served: Worldwide
- Website: City Products

Butler Brothers was a retailer and wholesale supplier based in Chicago. It was founded in 1877 as a mail-order company by Charles Hamblet Butler, George H. Butler and Edward Burgess Butler.

== History ==
In the 1920s, Butler Brothers moved into retailing with a chain of "Scott" and "L. C. Burr" stores. In the early 1930s, they developed the Ben Franklin Stores, franchised five and dime stores, and Federated Stores, which were franchised dry goods stores (many termed department stores) that operated under their own local names. Most were in small towns. By 1936, there were 2,600 Ben Franklin stores and 1,400 Federated stores.

In the 1940s and 1950s, Butler Brothers was one of the largest wholesalers in the country. Unlike many modern franchises, which seek to present a uniform identity to consumers, the Ben Franklin franchise largely benefitted dime store owners by making weekly shipments from their warehouses, where tens of thousands of items were kept in inventory. Not only could a store owner order merchandise on Friday and receive it on Tuesday to replenish empty shelves, but by consolidating shipments, saved a considerable amount on freight, and found it easier to manage his inventory.

Butler Brothers also organized special sale events every few weeks. Stores could order salebills with their own names on them, and in many cases, with sale prices they chose for the merchandise. Manufacturers would offer special prices to get the extra sales inherent by being included in such large promotions, which Butler Brothers would pass along to stores and consumers.

=== Scott-Burr Stores Corp. ===
Scott-Burr Stores Corp. was a wholly owned subsidiary of Butler Brothers and owned and operated two chains: Scott Stores, 5 cent to one dollar stores, with 116 units at the end of 1938, and Burr Stores, with 19 locations in 1938, dry goods stores. Net profit in 1937 was $182,000 and in 1938 it was $103,000. In 1946 Scott-Burr sales had reached over a million dollars per month.

=== Federated Stores ===
Federated Stores of America (not to be confused with Federated Department Stores, now part of Macy's), was at its peak, a chain of about 1400 independently-owned and operated dry-goods stores based on a common operating model and selling goods purchased and warehoused by Butler Brothers. It started operations beginning c. 1931. Butler Brothers sold their interest and were "off the map" by mid-1960s.

Sam Walton (of Walmart fame) at the very beginning of his career has tried to become a franchisee of Federated Stores (he ended up switching to Ben Franklin instead).

=== Own-branded department stores ===
In the 1950s, the company built 4 complete department stores in Greater Los Angeles: Lakewood Center (1952), Downtown Alhambra, Ontario, and Van Nuys. In 1962 there were a total of 7 west coast stores including Seattle and Butte, Montana. In the 1960s the Los Angeles buying office and plant was at 3030 South Atlantic Boulevard in Vernon, an industrial suburb of Southeast Los Angeles County.

In 1957 Butler Bros. bought TG&Y variety stores with 127 locations.

In February 1960, the company was bought out by City Products Corp of Ohio, a company which had been in existence since 1894 as an ice company, for $53 million plus assumption of Butler Brothers liabilities.

== Gallery ==
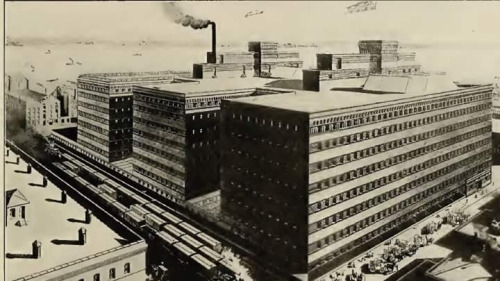
Butler Brothers warehouses in Jersey City, New Jersey, c.1910

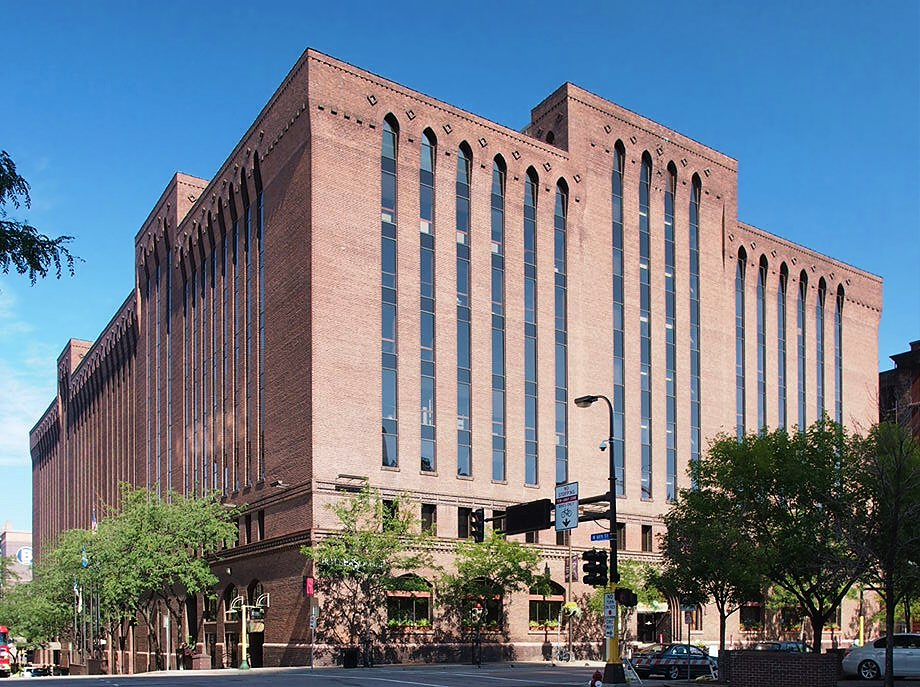
Former Butler Bros. warehouse in Minneapolis, Minnesota

== See also ==
- Ben Franklin Stores
- Butler Brothers Company building, now known as Butler Square, in Minneapolis, Minnesota's warehouse district
- Butler Brothers Department Stores
