= Frank Charles Peyraud =

American painter

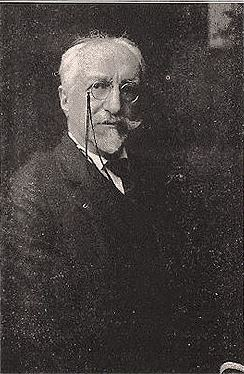
Frank Charles Peyraud (Fine Arts Journal, 1918), from the Illinois Historical Art Project

Frank Charles Peyraud (1 June 1858, Bulle, Switzerland - 1 May 1948, Highland Park, Illinois) was an American landscape painter of French-Swiss origin. He worked in a modified Impressionistic style and was one of the first artists to focus on landscapes in the Midwest.

== Biography ==
He displayed an early interest in art, but his father advised him to pursue a more practical education. He began his preliminary studies for architecture at the Collège Saint-Michel, and completed them, rather perfunctorily, at the Polytechnikum in Zürich. Later, at the urging of friends, he spent two years at the École des Beaux Arts in Paris.

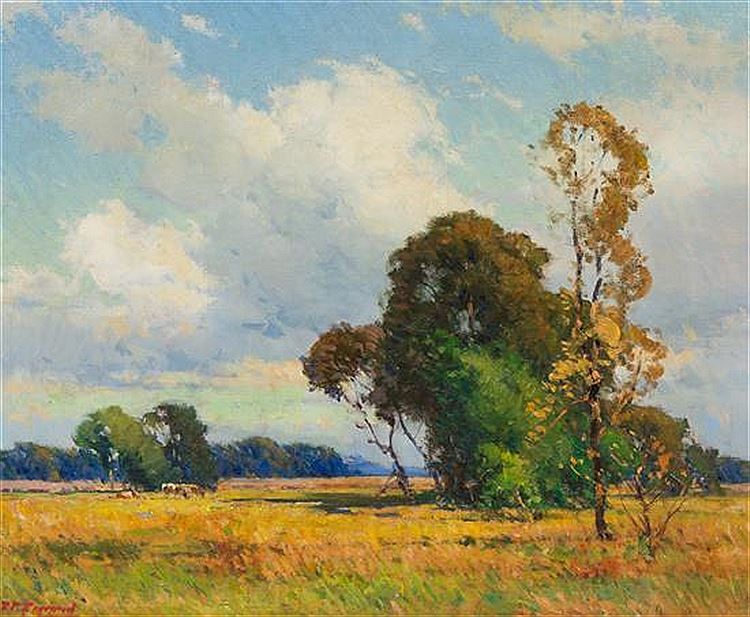
Summer

In 1881, at the age of twenty-two, for reasons unknown, he went to the United States with his brother Paul and decided that Chicago would be a good place for an architect. He was, however, initially employed as a cyclorama painter, having been rejected by the architectural firm of William Le Baron Jenney, apparently due to inadequate English language skills. Soon, he began studies at the Art Institute of Chicago; participating in their first exhibit in 1888.

In 1891, he became involved in retouching a famous panorama by Paul Philippoteaux depicting the "Battle of Gettysburg", when it was being prepared for an exhibit in Chicago. He continued to perform this type of work throughout the 1900s and was involved in several projects that did not come to fruition. He never took it seriously and referred to it as "potboiling". That same year, he and the landscape painter, Arthur Feudel (1857-1929) established a studio in Rockford. He also painted murals; notably in 1896 at the new Peoria Public Library, together with Hardesty Gilmore Maratta (1864-1924), an artist and paint manufacturer. For several years after, he returned there periodically to teach drawing classes.

He was a charter member of the Chicago Society of Artists, and helped found the Cosmopolitan Club and the Society of Western Artists.

His first wife, Angela Morand, also an emigrant from Switzerland, whom he had married in 1885, died in 1899 of tuberculosis. In 1906, he married Elizabeth Krysher (1872-1961), a portrait painter and illustrator. In 1919, they settled in Highland Park, a suburb of Chicago, but also travelled extensively. He returned to Switzerland with his wife in 1921 and stayed there for three years, once again travelling, throughout Europe, before coming back to Chicago.

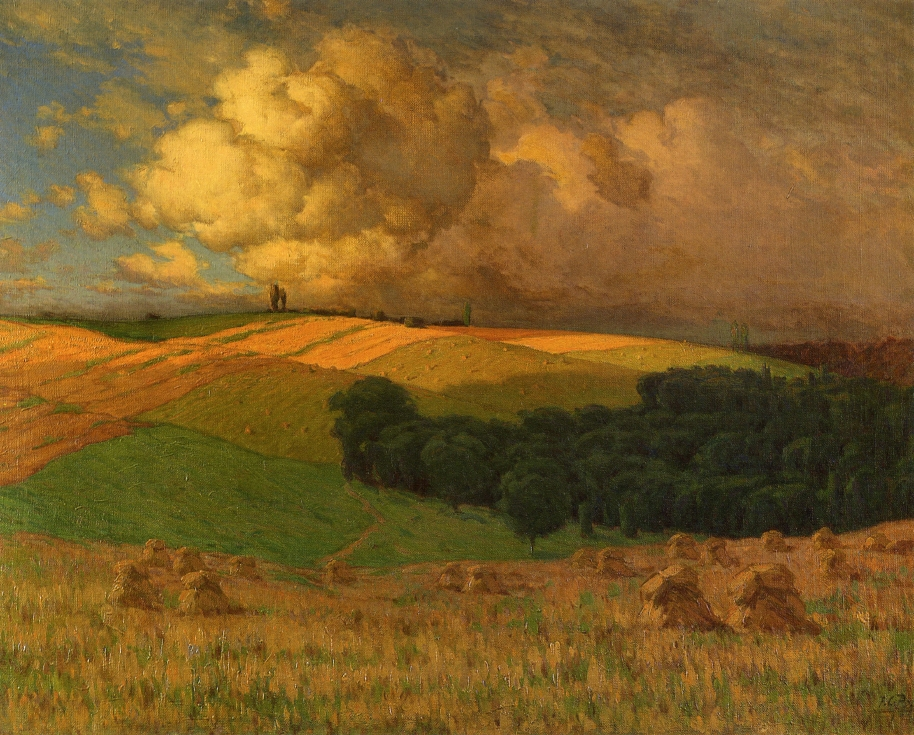
October

Despite failing eyesight, he continued to paint. His last exhibition was in 1948, just before his death, at the Chicago Galleries Association. He died during a family reunion.
