= Lewiston City Hall (Lewiston, Maine) =

- U.S. National Register of Historic Places
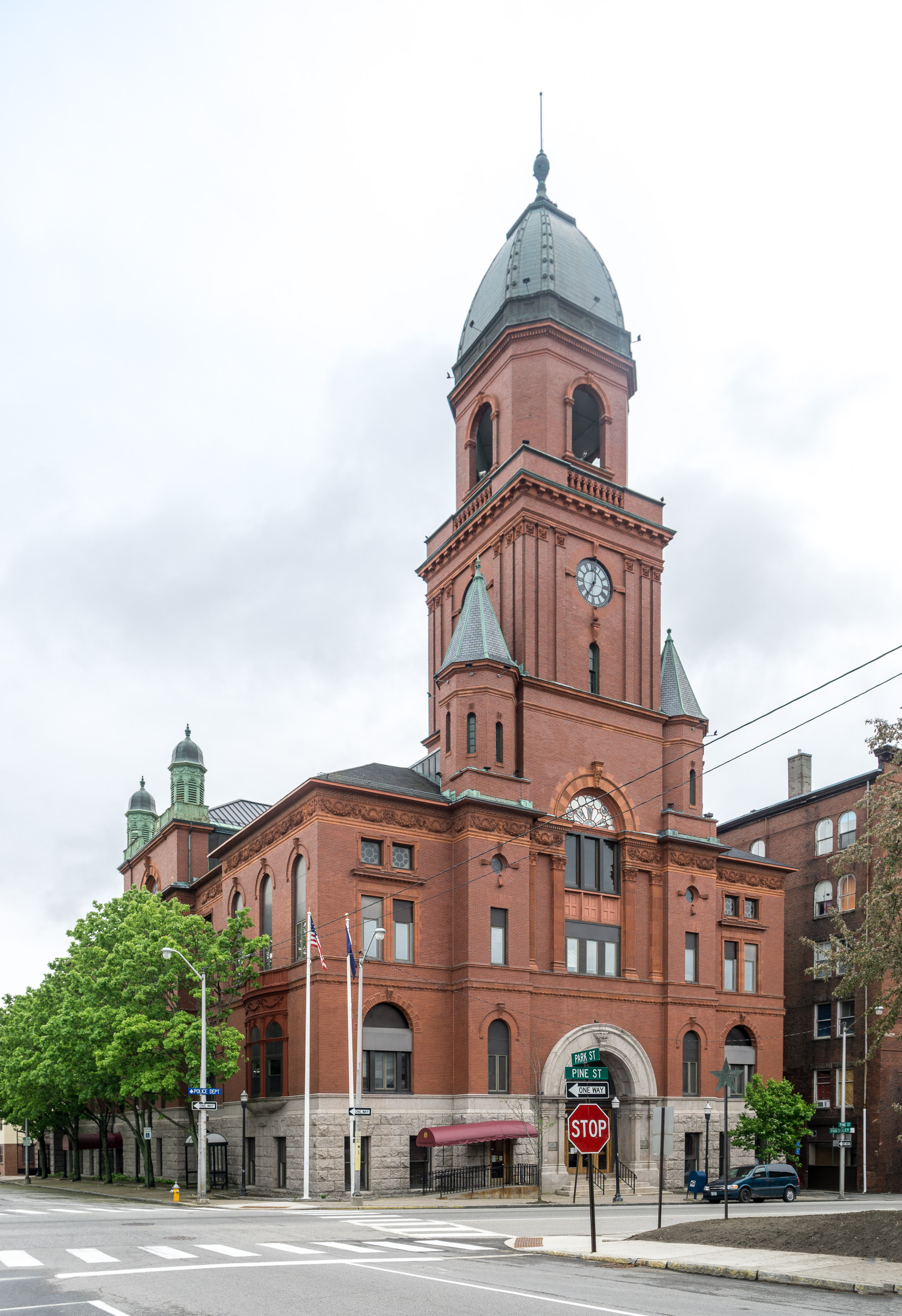
- City Hall, Lewiston, 2017

- Location within Maine Location within the United States
- Location: Pine and Park Streets, Lewiston, Maine
- Coordinates: 44°5′42″N 70°12′57″W
- Built: 1892
- Architect: Brigham & Spofford
- NRHP reference No.: 76000085
- Added to NRHP: October 21, 1976

Lewiston City Hall is located at 27 Pine Street (corner of Pine and Park Streets) in downtown Lewiston, Maine. Built in 1892, to a design by John Calvin Spofford, it is a distinctive regional example of Baroque Revival architecture. It is the city's second city hall, the first succumbing to fire in 1890. The building was listed on the National Register of Historic Places in 1976.

== Description ==
Lewiston's city hall is located in downtown Lewiston, at the southwest corner of Pine and Park Streets, across Park Street from Kennedy Park. The building is 90 feet wide, 160 feet long, and 185 feet in height from the sidewalk to the roof spire. Its main block is three stories in height, with the lower part of the ground floor finished in granite, and the rest of the structure finished in brick with granite trim. A slightly projecting center section houses the main entrance, recessed in a Romanesque rounded arch opening faced in granite, and rises to an ornately decorate tower with a belfry below a distinctive concave-sloped roof.

== History ==
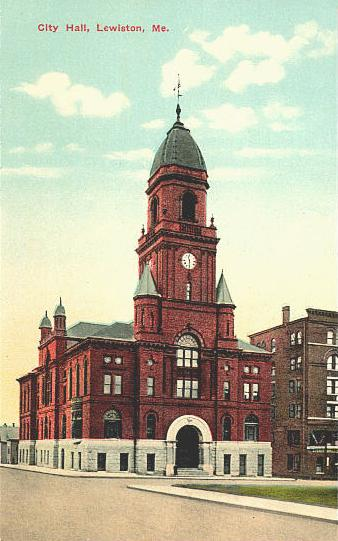
Lewiston City Hall in 1908

Construction began on Lewiston's original City Hall in July 1871, and it was dedicated in December 1872. The plans were drawn up by Mr. Meacham of Boston. It was made of brick with granite trim in a Gothic style with a mansard roof. It was built at a cost of $200,000.

The original city hall had 80 rooms, including the police department and prison in the basement, the library and post office on the first floor. The building stood for 18 years, until January 7, 1890, when a fire broke out behind an elevator wall, destroying the building. The uninsured city hall was deemed a total loss.

The present city hall was constructed, on the same site but with a smaller footprint, beginning on October 1, 1890, and was dedicated on May 19, 1892. The total cost of construction, including demolishing the remains of the original building, came to $180,298.40. It was designed by John Calvin Spofford, an architect based in Boston, Massachusetts.

== See also ==
- List of mayors of Lewiston, Maine
- National Register of Historic Places listings in Androscoggin County, Maine
