= Paul A. Couture =

American politician

Paul A. Couture (January 29, 1913 – May 16, 1992) was an American politician. A Democrat from Lewiston, Maine, he served in the Maine House of Representatives and the Maine Senate between 1951 and 1970. First elected in 1951, he served ten terms in the House and two in the Senate, including one term as Senate Minority Leader (1961–62). He also represented District Six on the Lewiston City Council.
