= Frank Sinatra and Jewish activism =

Frank Sinatra's support for Jewish causes in the United States and Israel

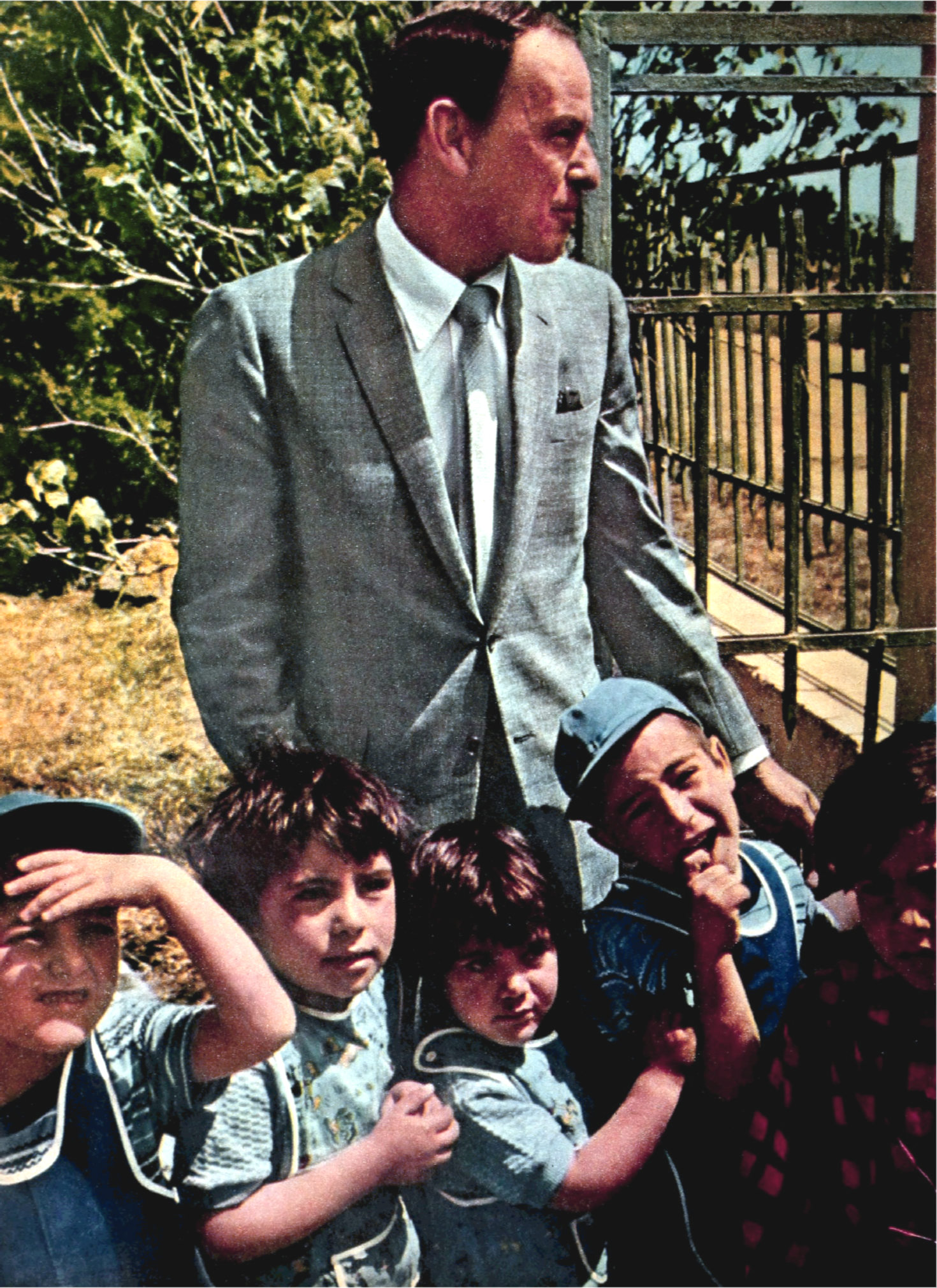
Frank Sinatra and children in Israel in 1962

Frank Sinatra was a strong supporter and activist for Jewish causes in the United States and Israel. According to Tom Santopietro, Sinatra was a "lifelong sympathizer with Jewish causes". Sinatra participated in Hollywood protests and productions supporting Jews during the Holocaust and the formation of the State of Israel. He actively fund-raised for Israel Bonds, the Hebrew University of Jerusalem, and the Simon Wiesenthal Center, and helped establish two intercultural centers in Israel which bear his name. Due to his support of Israel, his recordings and films were banned by the Arab League and by Lebanon.

== Personal relationships with Jews ==
Sinatra became friendly with Jewish individuals in his youth. His Jewish neighbor, Mrs. Golden, often babysat him while his mother was out working. She spoke to him in Yiddish and served him coffee cake and apples. For many years Sinatra wore a mezuzah charm that Golden had given him. In 1944 Sinatra insisted on a Jewish friend, Manie Sacks, serving as godfather at his son's baptism over the vociferous protests of the priest.

According to Swan, Sinatra despised racial prejudice and was quick to put a stop to it. Sinatra said: "When I was a kid and someone called me a 'dirty little Guinea', there was only one thing to do – break his head...Let anyone yell wop or Jew or nigger around us, we taught him not to do it again". Once he heard a reporter call someone a "Jew bastard" at a party and punched out the speaker. When Sinatra heard that some golf clubs restricted Jews from membership, he became the second non-Jew to join a club with a majority Jewish membership.

== Holocaust era ==
Sinatra's support of religious freedom found expression in support for Jews that were being persecuted during the Holocaust. In 1942, when the first reports of Nazi brutality against Jews reached the United States, Sinatra ordered hundreds of medallions struck with an image of Saint Christopher on one side and the Star of David on the other, and had them delivered to U.S. soldiers stationed in Europe as well as friends, business associates, and policemen who had provided security at his concerts. Years later, including after the Holocaust ended, he still wore it routinely.

In 1943 he joined the national tour of We Will Never Die, a four-month, six-city dramatic pageant staged by Ben Hecht to focus public attention on the Holocaust. In 1945 Sinatra starred in The House I Live In, a ten-minute short film about antisemitism and religious tolerance that won an Honorary Academy Award and was added to the National Film Registry in the Library of Congress in 2007.

== Post-war support of Israel ==
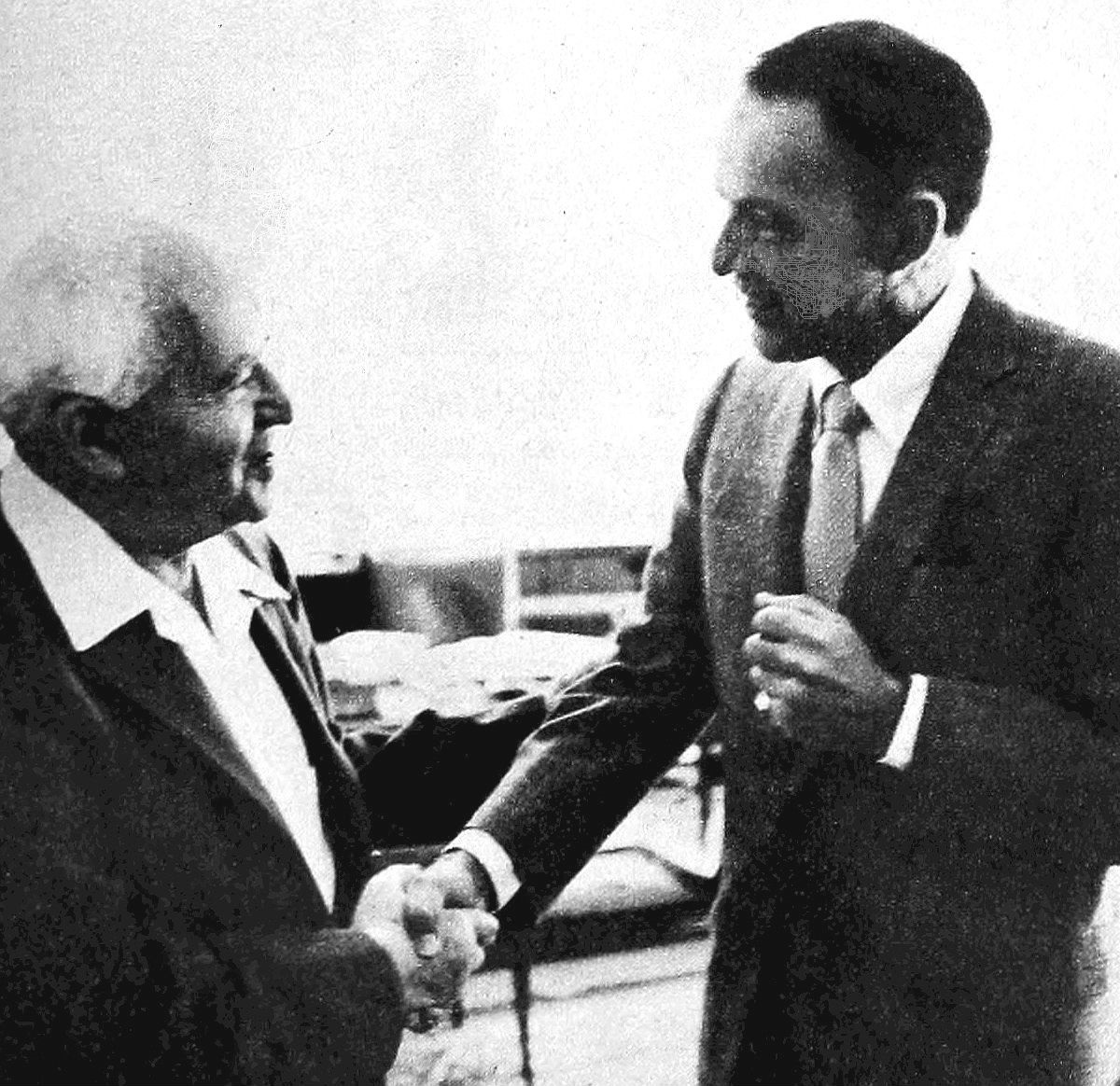
Sinatra and David Ben-Gurion

Like many of his contemporaries, Sinatra supported the establishment of the State of Israel. In September 1947, when the United Nations was weighing ratification of its Partition Plan for Palestine which would create a Jewish state, Sinatra performed at an Action for Palestine rally at the Hollywood Bowl that drew 20,000 supporters.

Sinatra was personally involved in a clandestine operation in New York City in March 1948 on behalf of the Haganah, Israel's pre-state paramilitary organization. The Haganah had established a base in New York to smuggle arms to Palestine over a U.S. embargo. The Haganah was headquartered in the Hotel 14, located on the same premises as the Copacabana nightclub, and was under continual surveillance by Federal agents. Haganah representative Teddy Kollek saw Sinatra at the Copacabana bar and enlisted his help for an undercover operation. According to Kollek:

I had an Irish ship captain sitting in the port of New York with a ship full of munitions destined for Israel. He had phony bills of lading and was to take the shipment outside the three-mile limit and transfer it on to another ship. But a large sum of money had to be handed over, and I didn't know how to get it to him. If I walked out the door carrying the cash, the Feds would intercept me and wind up confiscating the munitions. I went downstairs to the bar and Sinatra came over, and we were talking. I don't know what came over me, but I told him what I was doing in the United States and what my dilemma was. And in the early hours of the following morning I walked out the front door of the building with a satchel, and the Feds followed me. Out the back door went Frank Sinatra, carrying a paper bag filled with cash [estimated at $1 million]. He went down to the pier, handed it over, and watched the ship sail.

Sinatra told his daughter Nancy, "It was the beginning of a young nation. I wanted to help, I was afraid they might fall down". According to David Lehman, Sinatra "believed Zionism was a righteous cause".

== Visits to Israel ==
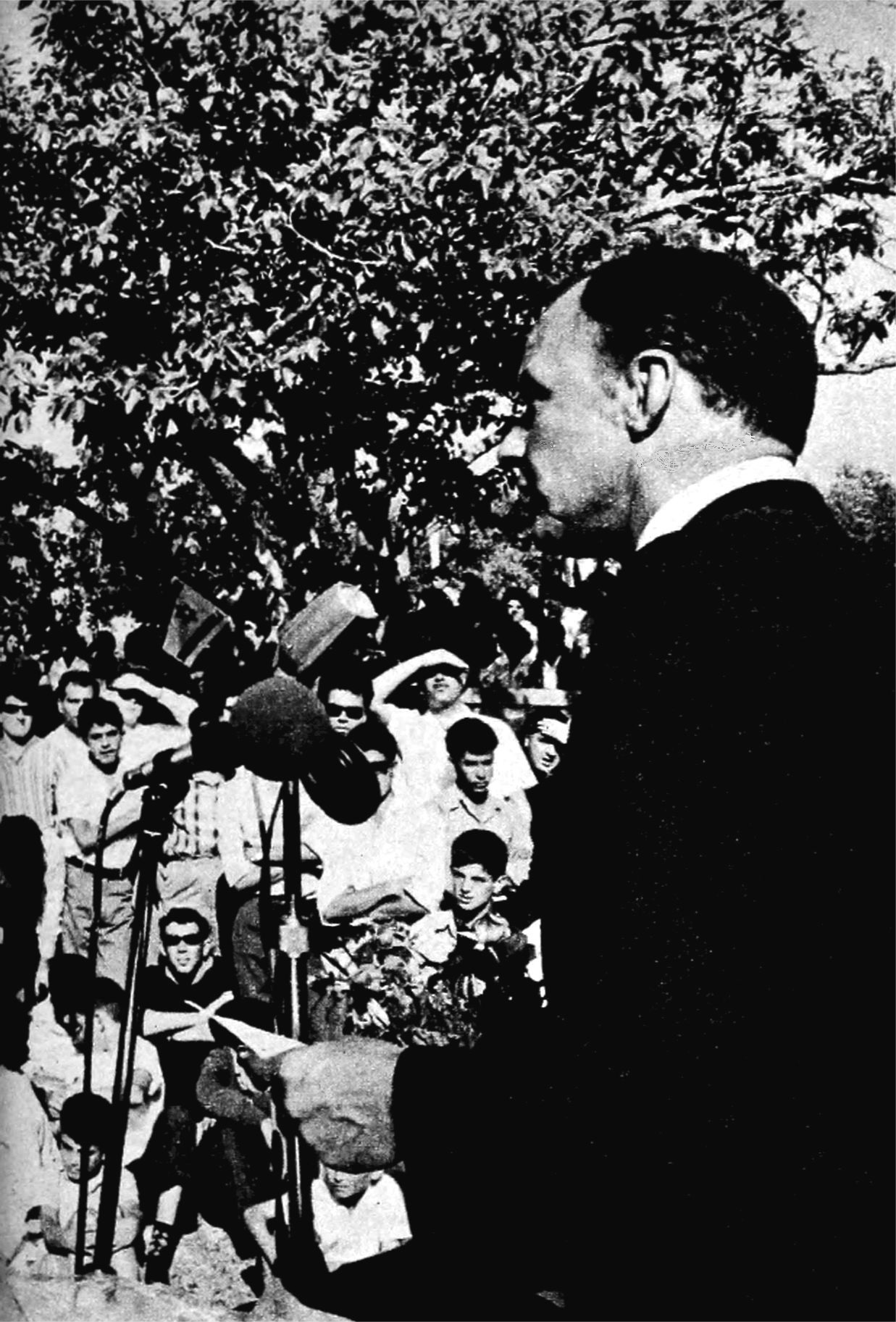
Sinatra in Nazareth in 1962

=== 1962: World Tour for Children ===
In 1962, Sinatra visited Israel for the first time as part of his multinational World Tour for Children. The tour, which raised over $1 million for children's charities around the globe, had stops in Japan, Hong Kong, England, France, Italy, Greece and Israel. In Israel, Sinatra gave seven concerts in six cities. His visit coincided with the country's annual Yom Ha'atzmaut (Independence Day) celebrations. Sinatra sang at the official Independence Day event in Tel Aviv and was seated beside Prime Minister David Ben-Gurion and General Moshe Dayan on the reviewing stand during the Israel Defense Forces parade. He also performed for troops at the Tel Nof Airbase and delivered a speech in Jerusalem "urging people all over the world to support Israel". A 30-minute short film, Sinatra in Israel, was later released, with highlights of the visit.

In Nazareth, Sinatra purchased a lot near Mary's Well for the establishment of an intercultural youth center for Arab and Israeli children, to be built by the Histadrut trade union. He donated the $50,000 profit from his Israeli concerts to the project.

According to George Jacobs, Sinatra's former valet, the 1962 tour was undertaken partly as an attempt to rehabilitate Sinatra's image into "the singing philanthropist" in the aftermath of his public fallout with John F. Kennedy and his Mafia ties becoming public knowledge. Jacobs also added that on this visit Sinatra began to call himself the "King of the Jews", and that he often made anti-Semitic remarks about Jewish business associates but would not do so while in Israel:

Mr. S adored Israel and Israel adored him right back. Here was a whole nation of underdogs and survivors, the people Sinatra respected most, people like himself who had beaten the odds. He was so awed by the place, so respectful, that he didn't tell a single one of his beloved 'Uncle Scrooge Cheap Jew' jokes the whole time we were there. These weren't the Beverly Hills fat cats who had treated him so badly, hence his bitter humour. These were battling pioneers. He was genuinely ashamed to have put them all in the same category.

=== 1964: Filming Cast a Giant Shadow ===
Sinatra returned to Israel in 1964 to film a cameo role in Cast a Giant Shadow, a fictionalised account of the life of Jewish-American soldier Mickey Marcus who had fought with the Israeli Defence Forces during the 1948 Arab-Israeli War. Sinatra played Vince Talmadge, a freelance American fighter pilot commissioned by the IDF who drops seltzer bottles to give the illusion of bombs falling before being killed in action.

The film was written and directed by Melville Shavelson, who later wrote a book about the experience entitled How to Make a Jewish Movie. Shavelson wrote that he was familiar with Sinatra from having been in Kennedy's entourage during his inauguration, and that he knew Sinatra "was most likely to do was what he wasn't most likely to do." During the shoot, Shavelson faced opposition from the Communist Party of Israel who, amongst other things, apparently considered Sinatra "a symbol of fascist oppression." The dispute was later resolved with the Communists who thanked Shavelson for having made changes to the screenplay, but this confused Shavelson as no such changes were ever discussed let alone made.

Sinatra donated his entire $50,000 salary from Cast a Giant Shadow to the newly-constructed Frank Sinatra Brotherhood and Friendship Center for Arab and Israeli Children in Nazareth. He attended the centre's opening, and gave the following speech:

I never grew up enough to really understand adults, but I think I understand kids. If we can get them together when they're young enough, maybe when they get big, they'll be smarter than we have been.

=== 1970s-1990s ===
In 1975, Sinatra performed at the Jerusalem Convention Center; this concert was released as the album Sinatra: The Jerusalem Concert.

In 1995, Sinatra marked his 80th birthday with various celebrations, including a trip to Israel on his private plane together with several close friends, including Lee Iacocca and Walter Matthau. An entourage of some 100 participants spent time with him in Eilat, after which they toured Jordan and Egypt.

== The golden Uzi ==
According to Eliot Weisman's The Way It Was, Sinatra was at one stage gifted a golden Uzi by Israeli prime minister Golda Meir as a symbol of Israeli-American relations. The Uzi travelled with him on tour for many years.

== Fundraising ==
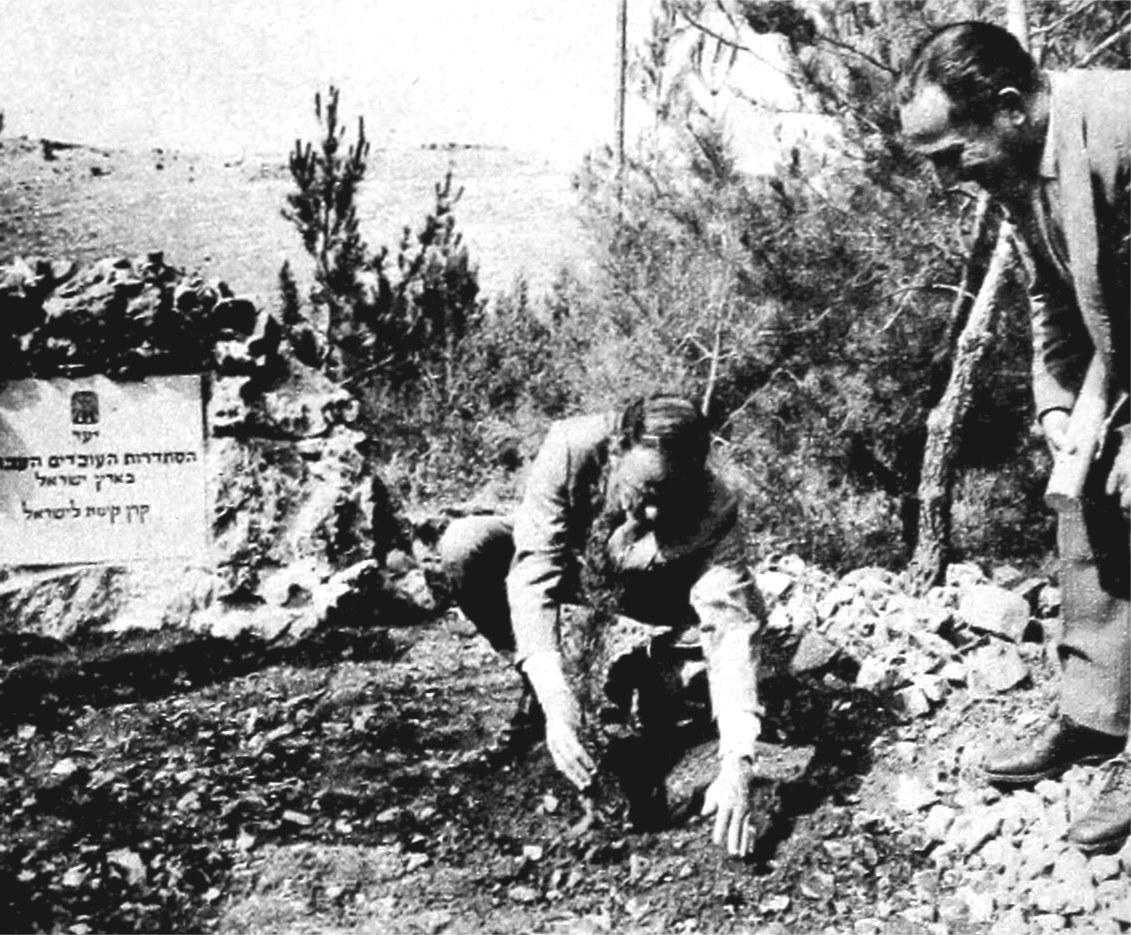
Sinatra planting a tree in Histadrut Forest of Jerusalem

Sinatra raised significant funds for Jewish causes. In the wake of the Six-Day War in June 1967, he and other Hollywood entertainers pledged a total of $2.5 million to Israel at a cocktail party hosted by Jack L. Warner; Sinatra personally contributed $25,000. In 1972 Sinatra raised $6.5 million in bond pledges for Israel, and in 1975 announced he was personally giving $250,000 to Israel Bonds "in memory of my parents' neighbor, Mrs. Golden, in Hoboken".

He raised significant money for the Hebrew University of Jerusalem including a $10,000 per couple reception in Chicago in 1977, and a $5,000 per couple trip to Israel in 1978. The Frank Sinatra International Student Center, funded in part by a Hollywood banquet hosted by Sinatra, opened in 1978. The building's cafeteria was later bombed by Hamas in 2002. Nine were killed and nearly 100 injured.

Sinatra met Simon Wiesenthal for the first time in 1979, telling the Nazi hunter that "he had been his hero for many years". When he found out that the Simon Wiesenthal Center was trying to produce the documentary Genocide, Sinatra told them, "Although I'm not Jewish, the Holocaust is important to me", and offered $100,000 to the project. He also became a member of the Center's Board of Trustees. In ensuing months, Sinatra made four appearances on behalf of the Center, bringing in $400,000 in funding for the film, which won the 1981 Academy Award for Best Documentary Feature.

== Awards from Jewish groups ==
- Hollzer Memorial Award from the Los Angeles Jewish community (1949)
- Medallion of Valor from Israel Bonds (1972)
- National Scopus Award from the American Friends of the Hebrew University of Jerusalem (1976)
- Israel Cultural Award (1977)

== Arab blacklists ==
Citing the singer's support of Israel, the Arab League's Israeli Boycott Bureau in Cairo issued a ban on Sinatra's recordings and films in October 1962. In a statement, the Arab League said it had conclusively determined that Sinatra "participates in the distribution of Israel bonds and that he exerts efforts for the collection of funds to be sent to Israel". With the signing of the 1979 Egypt–Israel peace treaty, this ban was voided.

In 1964 Sinatra was officially barred from entering Lebanon due to his "moral and material support of Israel". In 2014 NBC News reported that a collection of Sinatra CDs were on display in the March Lebanon office in Beirut, with the note that they were banned for "Zionist tendencies". Sinatra's banned recordings are also posted on the group's website, the Virtual Museum of Censorship.

Despite the ban, Sinatra albums and films still circulate in Lebanon. In 1964, at the same time the country announced it was barring Sinatra, one of his films was showing in Beirut. In 1966 Billboard reported that the ban was having its effect on Middle East sales of Sinatra's international number-one single, "Strangers in the Night", but the disc was still being delivered to Lebanon from other countries. The Virtual Museum of Censorship website acknowledges that despite the ban, Sinatra recordings are available in Lebanon.
