= Turrentine =

Turrentine is a surname. Notable people with the surname include:

- Howard Boyd Turrentine (1914–2010), American judge
- Stanley Turrentine (1934–2000), American jazz saxophonist
- Tommy Turrentine (1928–1997), American jazz trumpeter, brother of Stanley

== See also ==
- Turrentine Middle School one of six middle schools in the Alamance-Burlington School System
