= Amy Richlin =

American academic (born 1951)

- Born: Amy Ellen Richlin; December 12, 1951 (age 74)
- Years active: 1977–present
- Known for: Classicist and professor

Amy Ellen Richlin (born December 12, 1951) is a professor in the Department of Classics at the University of California Los Angeles (UCLA). Her areas of specialization include Latin literature, the history of sexuality, and feminist theory.

== Early life ==
Richlin was born in Hackensack, New Jersey on December 12, 1951, to Samuel Richlin and Sylvia Richlin. Her grandparents all immigrated to the US from Lithuania and Belarus. Her father studied at the Eastman School of Music, where he was close friends with Alec Wilder, but worked afterwards as a kosher butcher. Richlin's mother worked as a typist and secretary, most notably to Manie Sacks.

== Academic career ==
Richlin studied at Smith College, then transferred in 1970 to Princeton University, where she was the founding captain of the women's rowing team. She graduated from Princeton in 1973 as part of the first co-ed class to study there and then completed her PhD at Yale University, writing her dissertation on "Sexual Terms and Themes in Roman Satire and Related Genres". She taught at Rutgers University (1977–1979), Dartmouth College (1979–1982), Lehigh University (1982–1989), and the University of Southern California (1989–2005), before moving to the University of California at Los Angeles. She retired in 2022 from the University of California at Los Angeles after 45 years of teaching.

== Published works ==
Her first book was The Garden of Priapus: Sexuality and Aggression in Roman Humour (1983; rev 1992). She developed similar themes in collected works including Pornography and Representation in Greece and Rome (1992), and Feminist Theory and the Classics (co-edited with Nancy Sorkin Rabinowitz, 1993). She has publicly cited Australian classical scholar Suzanne Dixon as a great influence in shaping her work on gender politics. Richlin was the first to publish the word 'fuck' in the journal Classical Philology.

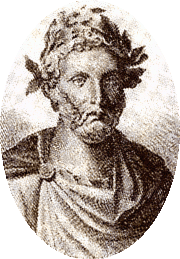
Plautus

In Rome and the Mysterious Orient, Richlin translated three works – Curculio, Persa and Poenulus – by the Roman playwright Plautus (notably using "references taken right out of American pop culture" to make Plautus more understandable to modern audiences). For example, the conventionally translated text:

The lover that first set out on the highways of love with an empty purse went in for harder labours than Hercules

was translated by Richlin as:

The dude who first set out to go on the road of love without no dough, / this guy had to go through way more shit than all them Labours of Hercules."

Her translation of Plautus' Rudens was adapted in a play Tug of War performed at the Getty Villa in 2007.

Richlin also engaged on a long-term project on the amatory letters of the young Marcus Aurelius and his teacher, Cornelius Fronto, with Marcus Aurelius in Love published in 2007.

== Awards and achievements ==
- ACLS Travel Grant (1987)
- National Endowment for the Humanities Fellowship (1987–1988)
- Women's Classical Caucus Prize (1992)
- Mortar Board Faculty of the Month (September, 1995)
- USC Associate Award for Excellence in Teaching (1996)
- ACLS Fellowship (2003–2004)
- Visiting Membership of High Table, Newnham College, Cambridge (2004)
- Loeb Foundation Fellowship (2010–2011)
- Lambda Classical Caucus Rehak Award (2011)
- Women's Classical Caucus Leadership Award (2017)
- Charles J. Goodwin Award of Merit for Slave Theater in the Roman Republic: Plautus and Popular Comedy (2018)
- Wilbur Cross Medal (2026)
- Doctor of Humane Letters honoris causa, University of Chicago
