= Jacob Weinberger =

American judge (1982–1974)

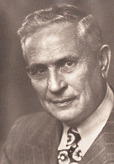

Senior Judge of the United States District Court for the Southern District of California
- In office November 1, 1958 – May 20, 1974

Judge of the United States District Court for the Southern District of California
- In office February 21, 1946 – November 1, 1958
- Appointed by: Harry S. Truman
- Preceded by: Harry Aaron Hollzer
- Succeeded by: Fred Kunzel

Personal details
- Born: Jacob Weinberger; January 4, 1882 Austria-Hungary
- Died: May 20, 1974 (aged 92) San Diego, California, U.S.
- Education: University of Colorado Law School (LL.B.)

Jacob Weinberger (January 4, 1882 – May 20, 1974) was a United States district judge of the United States District Court for the Southern District of California.

== Education and career ==
Born in Austria-Hungary, to Herman and Nettie Flaster Weinberger, Weinberger's family emigrated to Denver, Colorado in the late 1880s, where he attended the public schools. Weinberger received a Bachelor of Laws from the University of Colorado Law School in 1904, and was in private practice in Denver in 1904, and in Gila County, Arizona Territory from 1905 to 1911. He married Blanche Ruth Solomon on June 11, 1907, and subsequently became an assistant district attorney of Gila County from 1907 to 1909. He was a delegate to Arizona constitutional convention from Gila County in 1910. He was in private practice in San Diego, California from 1911 to 1941, serving as city attorney of San Diego from 1941 to 1943. He was a Judge of the Superior Court of San Diego County from 1943 to 1945, returning to private practice until 1946.

=== Other service ===
Weinberger served on the Board of Education for the San Diego School District for 21 years.

== Federal judicial service ==
On January 24, 1946, Weinberger was nominated by President Harry S. Truman to a seat on the United States District Court for the Southern District of California vacated by Judge Harry Aaron Hollzer. Weinberger was confirmed by the United States Senate on February 15, 1946, and received his commission on February 21, 1946. Weinberger was initially assigned to a duty station Los Angeles, but on November 1, 1949, he was assigned as the first resident federal judge in San Diego. He assumed senior status on November 1, 1958, serving thereafter until his death on May 20, 1974, in San Diego.

== Honors ==
The Jacob Weinberger Elementary School was named for him in 1963, and the Jacob Weinberger U.S. Courthouse in San Diego was renamed in his honor in 1988.

== See also ==
- List of Jewish American jurists

== Sources ==
Legal offices
Preceded by Harry Aaron Hollzer	Judge of the United States District Court for the Southern District of California; 1946–1958	Succeeded by Fred Kunzel
