= Fred Kunzel =

American judge

Chief Judge of the United States District Court for the Southern District of California
- In office 1967–1969
- Preceded by: James Marshall Carter
- Succeeded by: Edward Joseph Schwartz

Judge of the United States District Court for the Southern District of California
- In office September 10, 1959 – November 19, 1969
- Appointed by: Dwight D. Eisenhower
- Preceded by: Jacob Weinberger
- Succeeded by: Howard Boyd Turrentine

Personal details
- Born: Fred Kunzel; June 2, 1901 Buffalo, New York, U.S.
- Died: November 19, 1969 (aged 68)
- Education: Stanford University (A.B.); Stanford Law School (J.D.)

Fred Kunzel (June 2, 1901 – November 19, 1969) was a United States district judge of the United States District Court for the Southern District of California.

== Education and career ==
Born in Buffalo, New York, Kunzel was a private in the United States Army during World War I, from 1917 to 1919. He received an Artium Baccalaureus degree from Stanford University in 1925 and a Juris Doctor from Stanford Law School in 1927. He was in private practice in San Diego, California from 1928 to 1959, and returned to military service as a Commander in the United States Naval Reserve in World War II, from 1942 to 1945.

== Federal judicial service ==
On February 16, 1959, Kunzel was nominated by President Dwight D. Eisenhower to a seat on the United States District Court for the Southern District of California vacated by Judge Jacob Weinberger. Kunzel was confirmed by the United States Senate on September 9, 1959, and received his commission the following day. He served as Chief Judge from 1967 until his death on November 19, 1969.

== Sources ==
Legal offices
Preceded by Jacob Weinberger	Judge of the United States District Court for the Southern District of California; 1959–1969	Succeeded by Howard Boyd Turrentine
Preceded by James Marshall Carter	Chief Judge of the United States District Court for the Southern District of California; 1967–1969	Succeeded by Edward Joseph Schwartz
