= Omnibus hearing =

Type of pretrial hearing

An omnibus hearing is a pretrial hearing. It is usually held soon after a defendant's arraignment. The main purpose of the hearing is to determine the evidence, including testimony and evidence seized at the time of arrest. The federal omnibus hearing was originated by U.S. District Judge James M. Carter in the Southern District of California and later influenced federal pretrial procedure.

The counsel for the plaintiff (or the People) and the defendant attend the hearing to discuss pretrial matters pertaining to the case.

The purpose of the hearing is to see if the rights of the defendant have been violated, and it is the duty of the judge to make sure that the oath of office is preserved under article 6 paragraph 2, supremacy clause of the Constitution of the United States. To exchange discovery or any motions to dismissal or special appearance for violations at a state level and a Federal level.

Under the 7th amendment, the common law says that the defendant must have a victim or property damage in order for an actual crime committed, or a violation of the Constitution or bill of rights of another. Under the common law this would be to request for the victim or property damage to come forward for a statute or code. To find out if the authority delegated power under police powers did not violate any defendant of the bill of rights or due process.
