= Edward Joseph Schwartz =

American judge

Senior Judge of the United States District Court for the Southern District of California
- In office March 26, 1982 – March 22, 2000

Chief Judge of the United States District Court for the Southern District of California
- In office 1969–1982
- Preceded by: Fred Kunzel
- Succeeded by: Howard Boyd Turrentine

Judge of the United States District Court for the Southern District of California
- In office March 28, 1968 – March 26, 1982
- Appointed by: Lyndon B. Johnson
- Preceded by: James Marshall Carter
- Succeeded by: J. Lawrence Irving

Personal details
- Born: Edward Joseph Schwartz; March 26, 1912 Seattle, Washington, U.S.
- Died: March 22, 2000 (aged 87) San Diego, California, U.S.
- Education: University of California, Berkeley (A.B.); University of San Francisco School of Law (J.D.)

Edward Joseph Schwartz (March 26, 1912 – March 22, 2000) was a United States district judge of the United States District Court for the Southern District of California.

== Education and career ==
Born in Seattle, Washington, Schwartz received an Artium Baccalaureus degree from the University of California, Berkeley in 1934 and a Juris Doctor from the University of San Francisco School of Law in 1939. He was a Lieutenant Commander in the United States Navy during World War II, from 1942 to 1945, and thereafter served as a United States Naval Reserve Lieutenant Commander. After law school he was in private practice in San Diego, California, from 1940 to 1941. He resumed his legal practice after servicing in World War II in San Diego, becoming one of two original founders of Procopio Law in 1946. During this time he specialized on business, probate and corporate law. Governor Pat Brown appointed him to the Municipal Court of San Diego in 1959. He was a judge of the Municipal Court of San Diego from 1959 to 1964, and on the Superior Court of San Diego County from 1964 to 1968.

== Federal judicial service ==
On January 29, 1968, Schwartz was nominated by President Lyndon B. Johnson to a seat on the United States District Court for the Southern District of California vacated by Judge James Marshall Carter. Schwartz was confirmed by the United States Senate on March 28, 1968, and received his commission the same day. He served as Chief Judge from 1969 to 1982, assuming senior status on March 26, 1982, and serving in that capacity until his death on March 22, 2000, in San Diego.

== Honor ==
The Edward J. Schwartz United States Courthouse is named in Schwartz's honor.

At the time he was appointed chief judge, the district court occupied a very old and dilapidated post office building where I was sworn in as a new lawyer many years ago. Judge Schwartz led the campaign to build an appropriate Federal courthouse and Federal building in San Diego. But his involvement with the new courthouse did not end securing Federal funding. Judge Schwartz was so committed to this project that he actually supervised the planning and construction of the building. Many in the San Diego legal community believe that the current courthouse is a testament to the initiative, dedication, and tenacity of Judge Schwartz.

— Lynn Schenk, TESTIMONY OF HON LYNN SCHENK A REPRESENTATIVE IN CONGRESS FROM CALIFORNIA, General Services Administration's Federal Buildings Fund and Reorganization, 1994

== See also ==
- List of Jewish American jurists

== Sources ==
Legal offices
Preceded by James Marshall Carter	Judge of the United States District Court for the Southern District of California; 1968–1982	Succeeded by J. Lawrence Irving
Preceded by Fred Kunzel	Chief Judge of the United States District Court for the Southern District of California; 1969–1982	Succeeded by Howard Boyd Turrentine
