= Jacob Weinberger United States Courthouse =

- U.S. Courthouse
- U.S. National Register of Historic Places
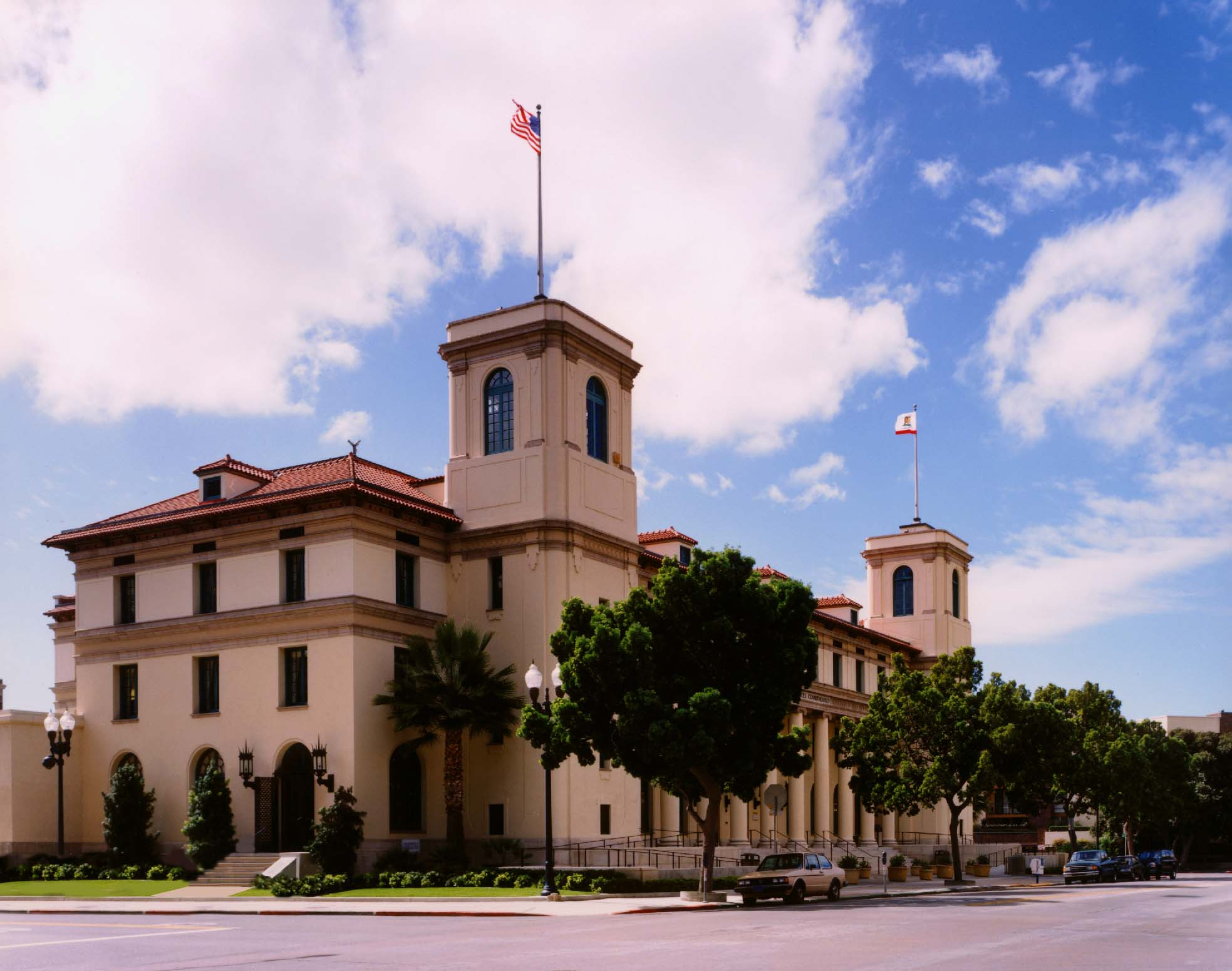
- Jacob Weinberger U.S. Courthouse, June 2003

- Location within San Diego Location within San Diego County, California Location within California Location within the United States
- Location: 325 W. F St., San Diego, California
- Coordinates: 32°42′48″N 117°9′55″W
- Area: 1.3 acres (0.53 ha)
- Built: 1913
- Architect: Taylor, James Knox
- Architectural style: Classical Revival, Mission/Spanish Revival
- NRHP reference No.: 75000468
- Added to NRHP: January 29, 1975

The Jacob Weinberger U.S. Courthouse is a historic courthouse building in San Diego, California. It is a courthouse for the United States bankruptcy court for the Southern District of California.

== Building history ==
Fueled by plans to build the Panama Canal, the turn of the 20th century brought aspirations of prosperity and status to San Diego. Civic leaders who lobbied for the construction of the canal hoped that the promise of increased commerce would establish San Diego as an international trade center rivaling San Francisco. A new federal building was commissioned to showcase San Diego's newfound standing and to provide governmental offices in anticipation of a burgeoning population and urban growth. To attract attention to the city, civic leaders began planning the 1915 Panama–California Exposition to celebrate the successful completion of the canal. The U.S. Courthouse was completed in 1913 and opened in time for the Exposition.

Originally called the U.S. Post Office and Customs House, the building also housed the U.S. District Court, Immigration and Naturalization Service (INS), and the U.S. Weather Bureau. When the economic crisis followed the outbreak of World War I, urban development in San Diego decelerated, halting plans to construct additional civic buildings adjacent to the U.S. Courthouse. Instead, the Courthouse's large front lawn was converted to a "victory" vegetable garden to support the war effort.

When prosperity was renewed during the 1950s and 1960s, the Courthouse's caseloads became the heaviest in the nation, requiring a new Federal building complex, which was completed nearby in 1976. Even though the Courthouse was listed in the National Register of Historic Places in 1975, it was abandoned for the following decade. Attention was refocused on the building in 1985, when much of the interior was gutted for conversion to INS offices. That same year, however, champions of historic preservation campaigned to restore the building. In 1988, the U.S. Courthouse was renamed in honor of Judge Jacob Weinberger. In 1990, an award-winning renovation and restoration project began to renew the historic lobby and main courtroom to their original beauty while creating new offices and courtrooms that evoked the elegant style of the 1913 period. Following this renovation, on April 29, 1994 the staff of the U. S. Bankruptcy Court for the Southern District of California moved in.

== Architecture ==
The Jacob Weinberger U.S. Courthouse masterfully melds two distinct architectural styles – Classical Revival and Spanish Colonial Revival – in a public building that speaks of San Diego's Hispanic heritage and its American ambitions. James Knox Taylor, Supervising Architect of the U.S. Treasury Department, described his design for the building as, "an adoption of the Spanish Renaissance, a style suitable to the traditions of the country – the history of the state, the climate and the desires of the people – it would follow the Mission style." Taylor's design resulted in an unprecedented amalgamation that quickly achieved regional prominence.

Occupying the northern half of the city block along West F Street, the T-shaped building is constructed of stucco-covered brick masonry walls resting on a limestone base, with steel columns and beams to support reinforced slab floors.

The portico, with its grand Ionic order colonnade, stands as San Diego's only surviving Classical Revival facade. The portico's ten concrete columns rise two stories to Ionic capitals sheathed in terracotta, supporting a terra-cotta tiled entablature. Flattened, abstracted classical ornamentation for the frieze draws from traditional Meso-American or Native American designs, featuring stylized arrow and shield motifs. Arched semicircular fanlights surmount first-story windows, and bracketed iron lanterns flank the central entrance. The second-story fenestration is simpler, with rectangular windows and terra-cotta sills. Above the portico, the third-story windows are each framed with low-relief pilasters with stylized motifs and a terra-cotta-tiled stringcourse. The attic windows are capped by an additional tiled cornice and painted wood panels below a bracketed eave to the low-hipped roof clad with terracotta tiles. Framing the portico are two square, five-story Spanish towers that are simply treated at the lower stories, with curved corners and colossal low-relief pilasters. A stringcourse above the third story delineates a fourth-story belfry with a tall arched window at each side, flanked by low-relief pilasters and brackets. A terra-cotta cornice and a stucco parapet continue the classical stylization at the top of the tower walls.

Through the mahogany entrance doors, the grand public lobby features the 1994 renovation's re-creation of the original post office lobby, which was adapted into the lobby of the U.S. Bankruptcy court. In keeping with the original fabric, the renovation architects worked from original shop drawings to restore missing historic elements. The terrazzo floor, including the Verde Antique marble and Lyonaisse Red marble bands and baseboards, and the Kasota Yellow-colored marble used for the wainscoting was artfully restored. Key features include the twin-globe sconces lining the walls, pendant lighting hanging from the coffered ceiling, and mahogany counters with bronze grilles above. Replicas of the original iron-cage elevators located in both towers are enclosed by the original gray marble stairs. Several pieces of 1930s Works Progress Administration art, with San Diego themes, were installed after the 1994 renovation. These include a ceramic sculpture by T.J. Dixon and James Nelson, titled The Immigrants, and two paintings on the third-floor, San Diego Harbor, by an unknown artist and San Diego Mural, by Belle Baranceanu.

The ceremonial second-floor courtroom, where Judge Jacob Weinberger presided, features a 20-foot coffered ceiling with acanthus leaf detailing, pilasters, plastered paneling, oak paneling, and marble counters for the judge and clerk benches, and the jury boxes. A new law library was added during the 1994 restoration, using materials and motifs that faithfully recall the original building details. Awards for the skillful restoration project included a prize from the California Chapter of the American Institute of Architects. In 1995-96, the building was named the Historical Office Building of the Year by the Building Owners and Managers Association.

== Significant events ==
- 1906: Congress appropriates $250,000 for the new Federal building in San Diego.
- 1911-13: The building is constructed.
- 1975: The U.S. Courthouse is listed in the National Register of Historic Places.
- 1976: A new Federal Courthouse and Office complex is completed, leaving the courthouse vacant until the mid-1980s.
- 1985: A campaign to restore the building for use by the U.S. Bankruptcy Court begins shortly after interiors are destroyed for conversion into Immigration and Naturalization Service offices.
- 1988: The U.S. Courthouse is renamed in honor of Judge Jacob Weinberger.
- 1994: An award-winning renovation is completed, returning the historic lobby and main courtroom to their original state.
- 1994-96: GSA is honored with numerous awards for the building's preservation and restoration.

== Building facts ==
- Architect: James Knox Taylor
- Construction dates: 1911-13; 1994 renovation
- Landmark status: Listed in the National Register of Historic Places
- Location: 325 West F Street
- Architectural style: Spanish Colonial Revival-influenced Classical Revival
- Primary materials: Stucco-covered brick masonry with steel beams, terra-cotta ornamentation
- Prominent features: Colonnaded portico, square towers
