= James Marshall Carter =

American judge (1904–1979)

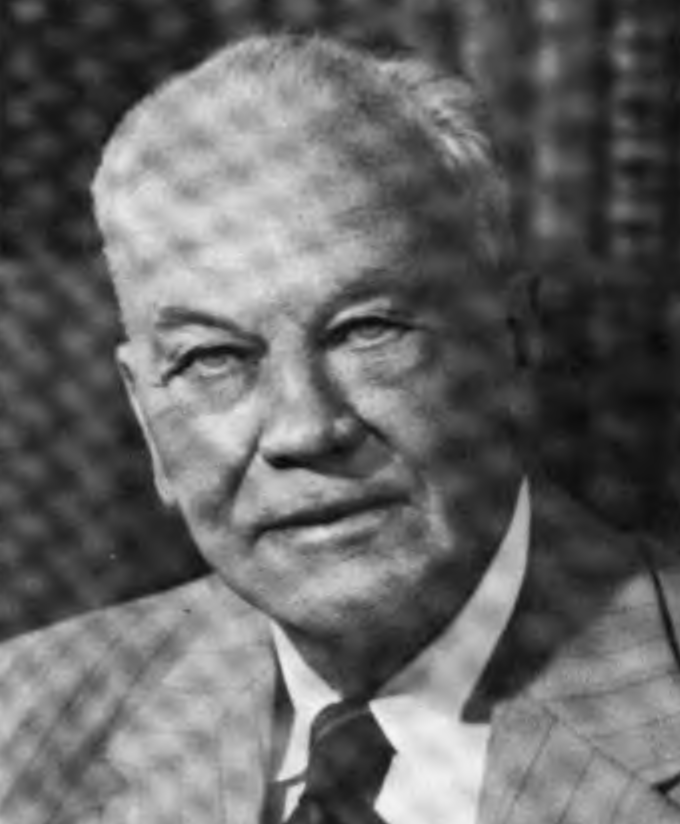

Senior Judge of the United States Court of Appeals for the Ninth Circuit
- In office September 30, 1971 – November 18, 1979

Judge of the United States Court of Appeals for the Ninth Circuit
- In office November 16, 1967 – September 30, 1971
- Appointed by: Lyndon B. Johnson
- Preceded by: Gilbert H. Jertberg
- Succeeded by: J. Clifford Wallace

Chief Judge of the United States District Court for the Southern District of California
- In office 1966–1967
- Preceded by: Thurmond Clarke
- Succeeded by: Fred Kunzel

Judge of the United States District Court for the Southern District of California
- In office October 18, 1949 – December 1, 1967
- Appointed by: Harry S. Truman
- Preceded by: Seat established by 63 Stat. 493
- Succeeded by: Edward Joseph Schwartz

Personal details
- Born: James Marshall Carter; March 11, 1904 Santa Barbara, California, U.S.
- Died: November 18, 1979 (aged 75) La Jolla, California, U.S.
- Education: Pomona College (AB); University of Southern California Law School (JD)

James Marshall Carter (March 11, 1904 – November 18, 1979) was a United States circuit judge of the United States Court of Appeals for the Ninth Circuit and previously was a United States district judge of the United States District Court for the Southern District of California.

== Education and career ==
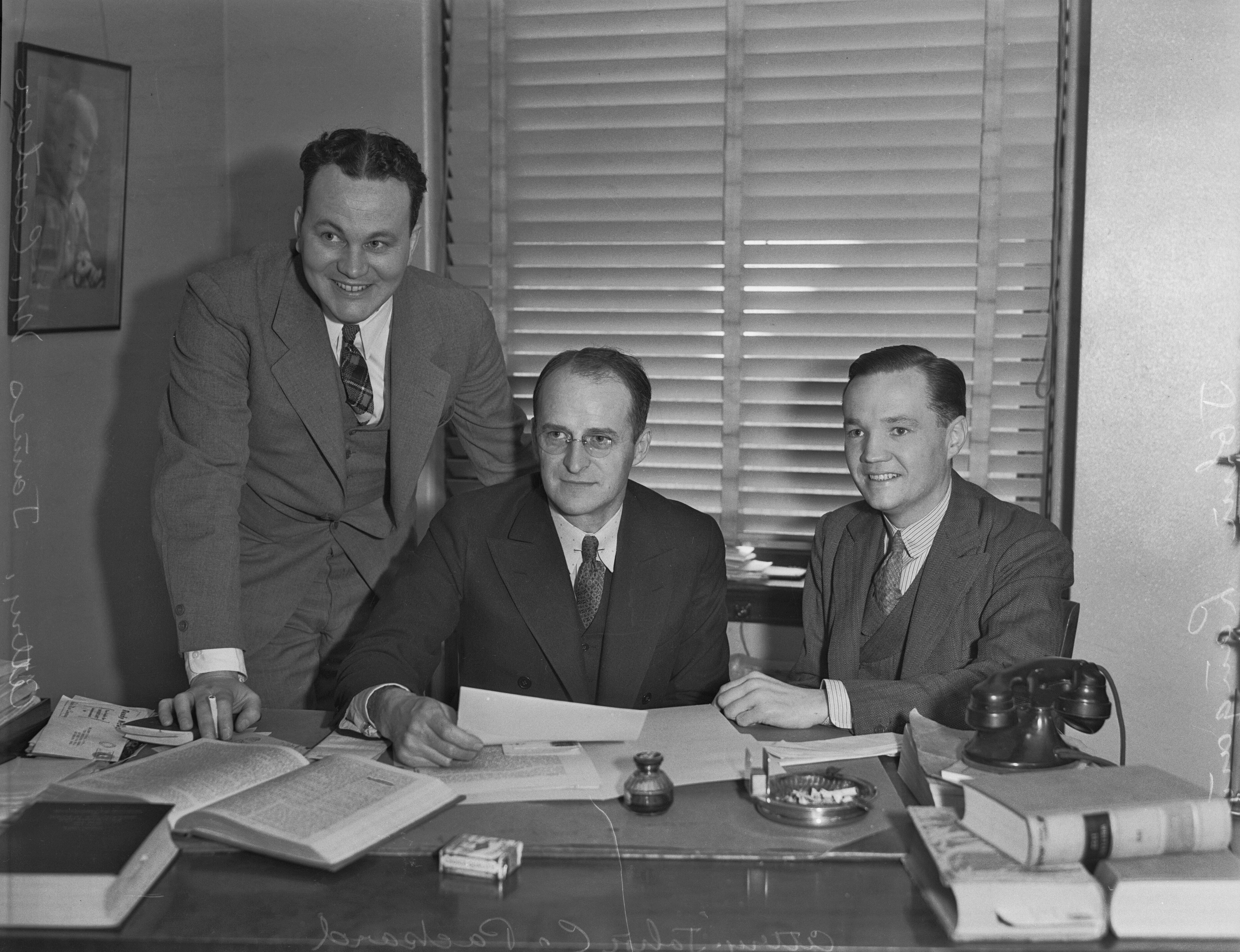
Attorneys John C. Packard (center) and James M. Carter (left) with miner John Langan (right) in Los Angeles, 1936

Born on March 11, 1904, in Santa Barbara, California, Carter received an Artium Baccalaureus degree from Pomona College in 1924. He attended Harvard Law School before he received a Juris Doctor from University of Southern California Law School in 1927. He was in private practice of law with John C. Packard in Los Angeles, California from 1928 to 1940. He was a teacher at the Police School of the Los Angeles Board of Education in California from 1934 to 1935. He was Director of the State Department of Motor Vehicles in Sacramento, California from 1940 to 1942. He was in private practice of law in Los Angeles in 1943. He was Chief Assistant United States Attorney for the Southern District of California from 1943 to 1946. He was United States Attorney for the Southern District of California from 1946 to 1949. During this time, he prosecuted Tomoya Kawakita for treason. The federal omnibus hearing was originated by U.S. District Judge James M. Carter in the Southern District of California and later influenced federal pretrial procedure.

== Federal judicial service ==
Carter was nominated by President Harry S Truman on September 23, 1949, to the United States District Court for the Southern District of California, to a new seat created by 63 Stat. 493. He was confirmed by the United States Senate on October 15, 1949, and received his commission on October 18, 1949. He served as Chief Judge from 1966 to 1967. His service was terminated on December 1, 1967, due to elevation to the Ninth Circuit.

Carter was nominated by President Lyndon B. Johnson on November 6, 1967, to a seat on the United States Court of Appeals for the Ninth Circuit vacated by Judge Gilbert H. Jertberg. He was confirmed by the Senate on November 16, 1967, and received his commission the same day. He assumed senior status on September 30, 1971. His service was terminated on November 18, 1979, due to his death in La Jolla, California.

== Honor ==
In a March 30, 2015, ceremony, the new federal courthouse in San Diego was named the James M. Carter and Judith N. Keep United States Courthouse to honor Carter and another federal judge.

== Sources ==
Legal offices
Preceded by Seat established by 63 Stat. 493	Judge of the United States District Court for the Southern District of California; 1949–1967	Succeeded by Edward Joseph Schwartz
Preceded by Thurmond Clarke	Chief Judge of the United States District Court for the Southern District of California; 1966–1967	Succeeded by Fred Kunzel
Preceded by Gilbert H. Jertberg	Judge of the United States Court of Appeals for the Ninth Circuit; 1967–1971	Succeeded by J. Clifford Wallace
