= Rudens =

Ancient Roman comedy

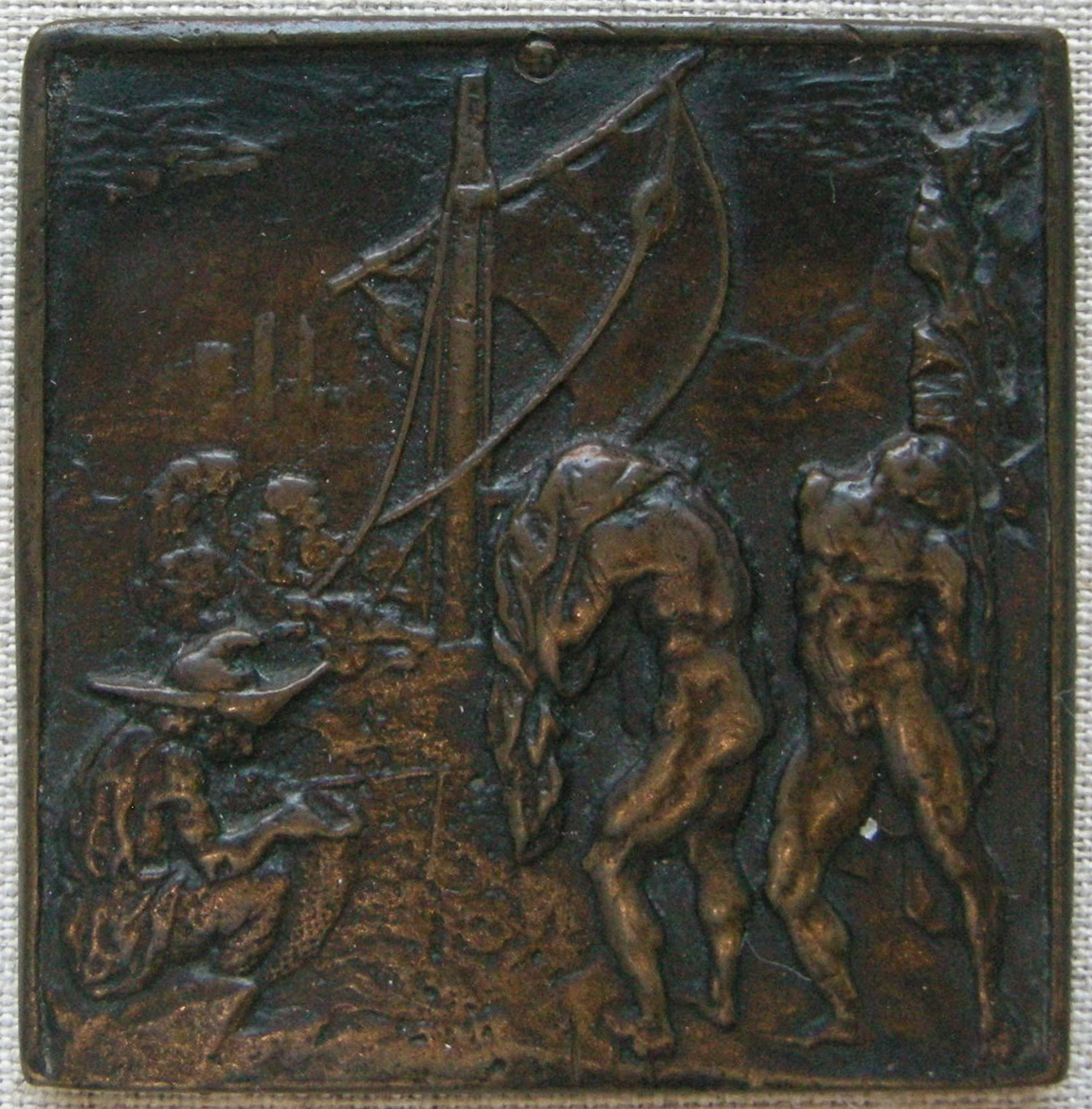
- Scene from Rudens (Cristoforo Foppa, c. 1485)
- Written by: Plautus
- Characters: Arcturus (the star-god); Daemones; Sceparnio (Daemones' slave); Plesidippus; Trachalio (Plesidippus' slave); Palaestra (Labrax's prostitute); Ampelisca (Labrax's prostitute); Labrax (pimp); Charmides (Labrax's friend); Piscatores (fishermen); Ptolemocratia (priestess); Turbalio (Daemones' slave); Sparax (Daemones' slave); Gripus (Daemones' slave)
- Original language: Latin
- Genre: Roman comedy
- Setting: the coast of Cyrene

Premiere
- Date premiered: c. 200 BC
- Place premiered: Rome?

Rudens is a play by Roman author Plautus. Its name translates from Latin as "The Rope;" in English translation it has been called The Shipwreck or The Fisherman's Rope. It is a Roman comedy, which describes how a girl, Palaestra, stolen from her parents by pirates, is reunited with her father, Daemones, ironically, by means of her pimp, Labrax. The play is set on the coast of Cyrene, in north Africa, although the characters come from a range of cities around the Mediterranean, most notably, Athens.

The date of the play is unknown, but from the average amount of musical passages that it contains, it is thought that it probably belongs to Plautus's middle period, about 200 BC.

== The story ==
=== The scene ===
The scene shows the entrance to a villa, and next to it a temple, with an altar in front of it. On the audience's left is a road leading to the town; on the right is a path leading to the sea. The neighbouring parts of the stage are supposed to be overgrown with bulrushes and other plants.

=== Prologue ===
Rudens is introduced by an actor representing the star Arcturus. Arcturus reminds the audience that Jupiter protects the virtuous and punishes those who have perjured themselves for gain. He then explains that the play they are about to hear was originally by Diphilus, and that the scene is Cyrene (in north Africa). The villa they see before them belongs to an old Athenian citizen in exile, whose daughter was lost when she was small. He explains how a vicious pimp had bought the girl and transported her to Cyrene, where a young Athenian man had fallen in love with her and paid the pimp 30 minae to purchase her. However, meanwhile the pimp had met a Sicilian man, who had persuaded him to break his oath and take her and another girl to Sicily, where they would earn a lot of money for him as prostitutes. He explains that the temple the audience see is the temple of Venus, where the pimp had invited the young man to breakfast. After the pimp embarked, he, Arcturus, had raised a storm that had shipwrecked them. The girls have escaped in a small boat and at this moment are approaching the shore.

=== Act 1 ===
1 The slave Sceparnio emerges from Daemones' house, and explains that there has been a great storm in the night which has blown all the tiles off the roof.

2 The young man Plesidippus appears with three friends. He apologises to them that their mission to catch the pimp at the port has failed, and declares that he is going to pray at the temple of Venus. Daemones, an elderly Athenian man, comes out and calls Sceparnio; Sceparnio behaves cheekily towards his master, who seems to lack the strength to contest this behaviour. Plesidippus greets Daemones. After some banter between Sceparnio and Plesidippus, the latter finally asks Daemones whether he has seen Labrax recently at the temple of Venus. He also describes Labrax as bringing with him two girls, who are later to be named as Ampelisca and Palaestra. Suddenly, Daemones notices two men, shipwrecked, attempting to swim towards the shore; Plesidippus immediately leaves with his friends, in the hope that one of them might be Labrax. After he has left, Sceparnio spots a boat in the turbulent sea, containing two girls. He describes the girls being knocked around on the sea, and then being thrown out. Daemones, however, sharply tells Sceparnio that, should he wish to dine at his master's expense, he should get back to work of collecting mud and reeds to mend the roof.

3 The next scene opens with the first girl, Palaestra, lamenting her situation; she is in an unknown country, and the gods have punished her unjustly. She suggests that her ordeal would be less awful if her companion, Ampelisca, were with her.

4 Nearby, Ampelisca is similarly upset. She sings that she wishes to die, and that she has nothing to live for; nevertheless, she is driven to continue by the prospect that her friend might be alive. Ampelisca's soliloquy is cut short when Palaestra hears her voice. After a time, the girls realise that they have heard each other's voices, and follow them. Finally, the two girls turn around a rock and meet each other, grasping each other's hands with joy. The girls can see only the temple nearby, and so decide to go in that direction. Outside the temple, the girls pray desperately to its god (at this point, they do not know which god the temple belongs to), so loudly, in fact, that the priestess, Ptolemocratia, is drawn outside.

5 The priestess sings in a rather pompous tone, asking the girls why they have turned up to the temple so poorly dressed, seemingly disregarding the fact that they have been shipwrecked. However, Palaestra's desperate pleas for mercy and supplication soon soften her spirit, and, after complaining that she has barely enough resources to look after herself, she states that she has a moral duty to do what little she can to help the girls, and invites them into the temple.

=== Act 2 ===
1 A group of fishermen cross the stage heading towards the sea, singing about their poor lives.

2 Plesidippus' slave Trachalio enters the scene, and in a tone of banter asks the fishermen whether they have seen his master. Having stated that they have seen neither Plesidippus nor Labrax, they leave. Because neither Labrax nor Plesidippus can be found, Trachalio comes to the conclusion that his master has been cheated by the pimp; Trachalio states that he had predicted this, and comically proclaims that he is a soothsayer.

3 On his way to the temple, to seek information from the priestess, Trachalio walks into Ampelisca, who is going to a nearby house (Daemones') to fetch water. Trachalio states that he recognises the girl, and Ampelisca recognises him; they enter into a friendly conversation, with Trachalio explaining that his master cannot be found and that Labrax has cheated him. Fuelling his ego, Ampelisca, too, states that he is a soothsayer, introducing further humour. Ampelisca refers to Palaestra being with her, the mention of whom prompts Trachalio to state that she is his master's girl. The conversation continues, as Trachalio obviously, but sweetly, flirts with Ampelisca who, apparently flattered, replies in similar ways; this gives further humour: while Plesidippus was negotiating the terms of buying Palaestra (his girl, according to Trachalio), Trachalio was forming a relationship with Labrax's other girl and Palaestra's friend, Ampelisca. Trachalio's wit is obvious soon after, explaining a rather complex logical argument to explain how Labrax could not have been caught by Plesidippus. Towards the end of this scene, Ampelisca states that Palaestra's misery is being caused by the fact that she has lost a chest, in the shipwreck, containing articles which would identify her to her parents, should she ever find them again; this becomes extremely important later in the play. Trachalio leaves the scene, entering the temple to speak to Palaestra.

4 Ampelisca continues with her task, and knocks on the villa door to get water. Sceparnio, Daemones' slave answers, and is delighted to see a woman — hardly the behavior of a slave, and thus another source of humor. Indeed, he interrupts her to suggest that it would be more appropriate for her to call again in the evening. He is given an extremely cold reception by Ampelisca, who is keen to complete her work. Incredibly, Sceparnio then announces that he is the resident priest, and that Ampelisca must speak to him nicely to get what she wants — an outrageous statement to be made by a slave. Finally, Ampelisca, tired of arguing, agrees to do whatever he wants, and so Sceparnio scurries away to fill her jug with water. However, after he leaves, Ampelisca looks out at the sea and notices, on the shore, two men, whom she instantly realizes as being Labrax and his friend, Charmides. Terrified, she retreats back to the temple to tell Palaestra and to seek safety.

5 Meanwhile, Sceparnio is returning with the filled jug, convinced that Ampelisca is deeply in love with him. When he does not see her, he presumes that she is playfully hiding, before his mood becomes more sour, until he gets tired of searching. However, worried that he would be in great trouble for leaving the jug, elaborately decorated, unattended, he takes it into the temple himself.

6 The emphasis shifts to Labrax and Charmides on the shore. They pointlessly argue for some time, blaming one another for the current situation; they suspect that the girls are both dead and that Plesidippus will not be happy, since he had paid a deposit for Palaestra.

7 Suddenly, they come across Sceparnio, now leaving the temple, and wondering why two women are there, crying. Hearing this, Labrax interrogates Sceparnio, realising that they are Ampelisca and Palaestra; his continual questioning annoys Sceparnio, who is then cheekily asked by Labrax whether he can provide them with a place to stay. Sceparnio does not oblige, but does offer to dry their clothes — an offer which Charmides refuses. The scene ends as Charmides enters the temple to seek shelter.

=== Act 3 ===
1 Shortly after, Daemones emerges from his villa, explaining a dream he had had about being attacked by a monkey, trying to climb a tree to get to a swallow's nest, because he did not lend the monkey a ladder; like the audience at this stage, he has no idea what the dream meant.

2 Daemones hears a great noise from inside the temple, and then sees Trachalio running out, exclaiming incomprehensible pleas for help. Trachalio hysterically approaches Daemones, begging for help in the same complex way, but still making no sense to the latter. Finally, he explains that two girls and the priestess are being attacked in the temple; he expands on this, explaining that a man (known to the audience as Labrax) is trying to take the girls, clinging to the altar, away. Being a decent man, Daemones calls upon two strong slaves, Turbalio and Sparax, to go into the temple to help them; Palaestra and Ampelisca leave the temple.

3 Having been found by the pimp, from whom she thought she was now safe, Palaestra despairs, asking what will become of herself and Ampelisca now; once again, she states that it would be better for them to die. Suddenly, the girls notice Trachalio, giving them some hope; however, despite Trachalio's reassurances, both girls insist that they are intent on suicide. Trachalio tells the girls to wait at the altar outside the temple, where both he and Venus will ensure their safety. Ampelisca prays to Venus for this protection, joined by Trachalio who begs for the goddess to help them both.

4 Daemones then emerges from the temple, along with Turbalio and Sparax, who bring Labrax. Another, more violent side of Daemones is seen: he insults Labrax, and instructs one of his slaves to punch him. Nevertheless, Labrax remains defiant, stating that he will have his revenge against Daemones and that the girls are, at least by the law of his own country, his property. However, Trachalio interjects, insisting that if any Cyrenian judge were summoned, he would agree that the girls should be free and that Labrax should spend the rest of his life in prison. Labrax responds harshly to having a slave arguing with him, continuing to speak to Daemones. However, seemingly enjoying the exchange between Trachalio and Labrax, Daemones orders the pimp to continue his argument with the slave. Finally, Labrax is defeated in his resolve, and converses with Trachalio, who threatens that even the slightest touch of the girls will result in him being beaten. Greedy as always, Labrax states that Trachalio may have the girls, but only if he is willing to pay, and indeed that Venus could have them if she were to pay. Daemones is outraged at the idea of Venus ever giving money to a pimp, and threatens him with further violence with even the slightest offense against them. Suddenly, Trachalio states that one of the girls is Greek, and has Athenian parents, which interests Daemones, realising that she is of the same nationality as him. This brings back the memories of his lost daughter, stating that she was only three years old when she was stolen by pirates, and that she would now be as old as Palaestra if she were still alive (not realising yet that Palaestra is his daughter). Trachalio then suggests that, to determine whether he or Labrax is more honest, they should compare each other's backs for weals from whipping for crimes; he believes that Labrax' back will be covered with more weals than a warship has nails, and that his will be smooth enough for a bottle-maker to execute his art. Labrax takes no notice of the threats, and makes for the villa, stating that he intends to fetch Vulcan (representative of fire), since he is an enemy of Venus. One of the two slaves makes a humorous comment, that there will be no fire in the house since they are allowed to eat nothing but dried figs. This is ignored, and Labrax explains his plan to build a fire with which to kill the girls; however, Daemones suggests that Labrax is burnt instead. Trachalio decides to leave to fetch his master, Plesidippus, to whom Labrax had sold Palaestra; his exit is slow, as he continually reminds Daemones to watch Labrax carefully.

5 After Trachalio has left, Daemones toys with Labrax, daring him to go and touch the girls. This carries on for some time, until Daemones sends one of his slaves, Turbalio, into the villa to fetch two clubs. On his return, Daemones carefully positions both slaves around the pimp, instructing them as to exactly how they should hold the clubs, threatening absolutely that any attempt to touch them whatsoever will result in their death, stressing also that he is not allowed to leave. Daemones then leaves to return to the villa. Labrax is left alone with the two slaves behind him. He jokes about the fact that, although the temple had formerly been Venus’, the presence of the two heavy-handed slaves with their clubs, makes it seem that it is now Hercules’. Having called out to Palaestra, Sparax answers, asking what he wants – Labrax is familiarly rude. Testing their patience, he asks whether he can move closer to the girls, but is threatened with the clubs; the slaves toy with him, encouraging him to move forward.

6 Trachalio returns with his master, Plesidippus. Despite Trachalio's diligent efforts to protect the girls and his hate for Labrax, he is berated by his master for not having killed the pimp; quite surprisingly, Trachalio shows significant mercy towards Labrax, appealing at Plesidippus’ suggestion that he should have killed the pimp ‘like a dog’. Labrax greets Plesidippus cheekily, but it is received with contempt. Plesidippus sends Trachalio to fetch the men who had accompanied him in the first instance, when meeting Daemones and Sceparnio, leaving, essentially, just Plesidippus and Labrax. Labrax questions Plesidippus, asking with which crime he is being charged; he then states that he cannot be charged, since he did not actually take the girls away – he just took them some of the way, hindered by the storm. Tired of the banter, Plesidippus throws a rope around Labrax's neck and orders him to march with him to the magistrate. As they walk past, Labrax's friend, Charmides, emerges from the temple, at Labrax's calls for help. Expecting to receive assistance from his friend, Labrax asks him why he is failing to act; Charmides ignores his former friend, and instead congratulates Plesidippus, and then tells Labrax that he is getting exactly what he deserves. As he is led off, the girls are brought into the safety of Daemones’ villa, and Charmides, in soliloquy, states humorously that he intends to testify at the court...for the prosecution.

=== Act 4 ===
1 Daemones emerges from his villa, again in soliloquy, stating what a good job he has done in saving the two girls, and how beautiful he considers the two girls, in his protection, to be. This leads onto his wife, who is now intently watching him, mistrustful of his fidelity. He refers to his slave, Gripus, who is a fisherman whom he sent out the last night to fish. He is late, and Daemones doubts that, given the severity of the storm, he could have caught anything.

2 The scene switches to Gripus, alone, carrying his net behind him; his mood is unusually raised considering that he could not have caught much. However, he soon states that his net is heavy because of gift from Neptune and furthermore, that he hasn't caught a single fish. Gripus explains how he has been blessed with his prized catch because of his diligence, and then reveals that what he has caught is a wickerwork trunk — because of its weight, he presumes that it is filled with gold, and gets carried away imagining that he can buy his own freedom and become rich and famous. He drags off the trunk to hide it.

3 Trachalio calls him. Despite Gripus' assumption that he has come looking for fish, Trachalio insists that he only wishes to speak with him, while carefully examining the contents of the net. Trachalio begins to explain his interest in Gripus' catch. Trachalio explains that he knows the owner of the trunk, and that it should be returned — Gripus takes no notice, arguing that it is his property now. He justifies his cause by using the example of a fish — a fish in the sea cannot belong to anyone, but once it has been caught, it is the property of the fisherman. Trachalio, showing his quick-wit, states that if he is correct, the trunk is as much his as it is Gripus's. The argument becomes increasingly obscure as Trachalio demands in which way a trunk can be treated in the same way as a fish, to which Gripus states that there is such thing as a trunk-fish. Trachalio becomes sick of the argument, and instead suggests that they seek an arbitrator to make a decision — characteristic of Gripus, he suggests a tug of war — an idea much scorned by Trachalio. Humorously, Trachalio threatens to punch Gripus (even though the latter is obviously far stronger); a similar threat from Gripus makes him back down quickly, offering a 50:50 share of the trunk. A failed attempt by Trachalio to carry off the trunk leads to more argument; Gripus quickly gives up, lacking the wit to keep up with Trachalio. There is a final futile attempt by Gripus to win the trunk by reasoning, suggesting that if Trachalio leaves him with the trunk, he will not be an accessory to the crime. Trachalio finally suggests that the man living in the nearby villa (Daemones) should act as the arbitrator; to himself, Gripus utters that he cannot lose the trunk now, presuming that his master will side with him.

4 The scene moves to the entrance of the villa, where Daemones has been forced, by his jealous wife, to let the girls go from the house — Ampelisca and Palaestra are despairing once again. Gripus and Trachalio arrive at the villa and greet Daemones, when, upon hearing that Gripus is Daemones' slave, Trachalio is astounded. However, he speaks politely to Daemones, greeting him, and then, surprisingly, stating how excellent it is that they are master and slave. Gripus and Trachalio enter into a childish race to give their side of the story first — to the audience's (and Gripus') surprise, Daemones gives Trachalio the right to speak first — after a brief explanation that the trunk belongs to Labrax, they quarrel again. Daemones appears to be watching the spectacle as a comic event, commenting on the wit of either side and laughing at insults hurled by each of them. Trachalio continues the story by stating that he does not claim anything in the trunk, and that he instead wishes to return an item to Palaestra — a box containing toys from when she was a baby. Instantly, Daemones agrees that he should have the box, despite an appeal from Gripus that they might be gold. However, showing absolute devotion to the girls, he states that he will pay Gripus in gold for whatever he takes from the trunk — despite not having the means. Trachalio then proposes that Palaestra should be made to recognise the box, to make sure that he is correct; Gripus protests again. Daemones asks Trachalio to explain the story again, invoking considerable annoyance, and even more with an interruption from Gripus. Finally, Gripus hands the trunk over to Daemones, on condition that anything not belonging to the girls he can keep. Daemones asks the girls whether the trunk is that in which the box of trinkets was kept — they confirm it, and Gripus, cynical, states that they did not even look at it. Palaestra counters this by telling Daemones to look inside the trunk and box, while she describes all the contents. As Palaestra recognizes the box, she exclaims that her parents are in there, which Gripus comically takes literally, stating that she will be punished for imprisoning her parents in a box. They begin the proof of ownership, as Palaestra describes the items in the box; the first is a small golden sword with an inscription, "Daemones," which she states is her father's name. Daemones begins to realize the truth — that Palaestra is his daughter. The next is a small axe with another inscription — Daedalis — the name of Palaestra's mother and of Daemones' wife. The scene erupts into three simultaneous soliloquies — Daemones exclaiming his joy at finding his daughter, Gripus lamenting the loss of the articles in the trunk, Palaestra continuing to describe the items in the box. Finally, this is broken when Daemones states that he is her father, and that her mother is just inside the house. Trachalio congratulates Daemones, and they all — except for Gripus — enter the house. Gripus laments his loss, suggesting that he should just hang himself.

5 Daemones comes out from his villa, talking to himself about his good fortune and his intention to marry his new-found daughter to Plesidippus. Through the door of the house he spots his wife hugging Palaestra.

6 He orders his wife to prepare a thanksgiving sacrifice. Trachalio comes out and Daemones orders him to fetch his master, and tell him that he intends to give Palaestra to him as his wife. To everything Trachalio replies "no problem!" (licet). Trachalio in turn begs Daemones to ask Plesidippus to grant him his freedom, and allow him to marry Ampelisca, which Daemones agrees to in the same manner. Trachalio departs.

7 Gripus comes out of the villa and advises Daemones to keep Labrax's money for himself. Daemones says this would be dishonest and states that he will return it to its rightful owner. They both go into the house.

8 Trachalio comes back with Plesidippus, who is asking him for his advice, to which Trachalio repeatedly answers "Good idea!" (censeo!) until finally Plesidippus asks if he should hug the mother and daughter, to which Trachalio answers non censeo! They enter the villa.

=== Act 5 ===
1 Labrax enters, bemoaning his misfortune. He says he is going into the temple to fetch his remaining slave, Ampelisca, so that at least he won't lose everything.

2 Gripus comes out and begins to rub the rust off an iron spit needed for the sacrifice. He grumbles that he has been given no reward finding the travelling case and that he intends to advertise for the owner. Labrax, overhearing this, and delighted that the case has been found, questions Gripus about it. Gripus offers to take him to it for a large reward. After bargaining, Labrax agrees to swear on the altar nearby that he will pay him. But after Gripus goes inside Labrax declares that he has no intention of keeping his word.

3 Daemones and Gripus come out and Labrax tells Daemones he is happy to let Palaestra stay with her father without payment. Gripus now demands his reward, which Labrax refuses to pay. Hearing this Daemones insists that Labrax should pay it. Despite Gripus's constant interjections, Daemones comes to an arrangement with Labrax, that Labrax will pay the money; half will be given back to him in return for Ampelisca's freedom, and half will be given to Gripus with which he can buy his freedom. He invites `Labrax to dine with him, and Labrax agrees. They all go inside the house.

== Two plays in one? ==
It has been argued, because of its length and certain inconsistencies in the story, that the Rudens in fact combines the plots of two Greek plays. According to this theory the first half is copied from a play by Diphilus, rich in mythological allusion and tragic monody. In this play, when the young man catches up with the pimp, he takes him to court on the grounds of a broken contract, with no mention being made of the fact that the girl is free-born. Sceparnio, Ampelisca, Charmides, and the priestess of Venus play an important role, and the setting is Cyrene in north Africa.

The second half (according to this argument) is taken from a play possibly by a different author, equally containing a shipwreck, but not necessarily in north Africa. In the second play a different slave of Daemones finds the chest, the shipwrecked girl is recognised as Daemones' daughter, and the young man is recognised as a relative of Daemones. This second half of Rudens is in a different style, with no mythological allusions, but full of verbal quibbles such as Trachalio's repeated licet in Act 4.6 and his repeated censeo in Act 4.8. One inconsistency between the two halves of Rudens is that Trachalio is sent in Act 3.6 to fetch Plesidippus's three friends, but he does not do so.

Another theory to explain the apparent inconsistencies in the play is that the characters of Sceparnio, Ampelisca, and Charmides may have been added by Plautus himself to Diphilus's Greek original.

Another play which apparently had a very similar theme to Rudens is the fragmentary Vidularia of Plautus, named after the vidulus or travelling case which contained the tokens needed to prove the shipwrecked girl's identity. Vidularia seems to be more like the second half of Rudens than the first. In an article on the play, Katalin Dér writes: "Vidularia lacks the roles of the Sicilian and the priestess of Venus, of Ampelisca and Sceparnio". The shipwrecked girl does however take refuge in a temple of Venus.

== Metrical structure ==
Plautus's plays are traditionally divided into five acts; these are referred to here for convenience, since many editions make use of them. However, it is not thought that they go back to Plautus's time, since no manuscript contains them before the 15th century. Also, the acts themselves do not always match the structure of the plays.

The different scenes of the play are more clearly differentiated by changes of metre from one to another. The usual pattern is to begin each section with iambic senarii (which were spoken without music), then a scene of music in various metres. Each section is rounded off by trochaic septenarii, which were apparently recited or sung to the accompaniment of tibiae (a pair of reed pipes). The scheme in the Rudens is slightly different. Instead of ABC, ABC, ABC... the scheme is as follows:

ABBC, AC, ACBBC; ABBC, AC, ACBAC

In each of the first two sections, the musical interlude consists of a polymetric passage followed by iambic septenarii; there is another long passage of iambic septenarii in the fourth section. The iambic septenarius was particularly associated with comedy (and never used in tragedy). Often this metre is associated with love, as in Act 2, scene 3, but it seems that Plautus here experiments with other uses, such as the bargaining between Gripus and Labrax over a reward in Act 5.

=== The girls escape from the sea ===
- Prologue; Act 1.1–1.2 (lines 1–184): iambic senarii (181 lines)

The star Arcturus introduces the scene and tells how he caused a storm.
(line 83) Daemones' slave Sceparnio complains about the storm. The young man Plesidippus arrives and asks Daemones if he has seen Labrax. Suddenly Daemones spots two men on the beach. Sceparnio spots the two girls approaching the shore in a boat.

- Act 1.3–1.5 (185–289): polymetric song (105 lines)

Palaestra and Ampelisca sing a tearful lament in a variety of metres at first separately and then together. The metres are reizianum, iambic, bacchiac, anapaestic, cretic, and trochaic The kindly priestess welcomes them, singing in bacchiacs, an appropriately dignified metre.

- Act 2.1–2.3 (290–413): iambic septenarii (123 lines)

Some fishermen cross the stage singing of their lot. Trachalio (Plesidippus' slave) questions them if they have seen Labrax or Plesidippus. Next he meets Ampelisca and flirts with her. She tells him about her mistress's lost travelling-case.

- Act 2.4 (414–441): trochaic septenarii (28 lines)

Ampelisca begs Sceparnio for water. Sceparnio flirts with her shamelessly before eventually agreeing to fetch some water for her.

=== Labrax discovers the girls ===
- Act 2. (cont.)–2.6 (442–558): iambic senarii (109 lines)

Ampelisca sees the pimp Labrax approaching and runs into the temple. Sceparnio is puzzled to find her gone, and carries the pitcher of water over to the temple himself. While he is inside, Labrax and Charmides appear, soaking wet, each blaming the other for the disaster.

- Act 2.7 (559–592): trochaic septenarii (34 lines)

Sceparnio comes out of the temple and unwittingly reveals that the girls are inside.

=== Daemones rescues the girls ===
- Act 3.1 (593–614): iambic senarii (24 lines).

Daemones relates a strange dream about a monkey who was demanding a ladder to climb up to a swallow's nest.

- Act 3.2 (615–663): trochaic septenarii (49 lines).

Trachalio comes out of the temple and calls Daemones for help. Daemones rescues the girls from the temple.

- Act 3.3 (664–681a): mostly cretics (18 lines)

Palaestra laments her lot.

- Act 3.3 (cont.) (682–705): iambic septenarii (24 lines)

Trachalio encourages the girls to take refuge by sitting on the altar. The girls pray to Venus.

- Act 3.4 (706–779): trochaic septenarii (74 lines)

Daemones summons two lorarii ("whip men") to keep guard on Labrax.

=== Daemones recognises his daughter ===
- Act 3.5–4.1 (780–905): iambic senarii (125 lines)

Daemones leaves the slaves to watch over Labrax. Trachalio returns with Plesidippus, who forces Labrax to accompany him to the magistrate. After they have gone, it seems that the girls are taken into Daemones' villa. At line 892 Daemones comes out and wonders why his slave Gripus, who had gone off to fish, has not returned. Soon, when his wife calls him in for lunch, he goes back inside.

- Act 4.2–4.3 (906–962): polymetric (57 lines)

Gripus enters with his net, trailing a rope, singing in various metres but especially anapaestic octonarii of how rich he will be after finding a chest in the sea. The metre switches to iambic quaternarii when Trachalio grabs the rope, then to anapaestic quarternarii when he threatens to reveal Gripus's theft.

- Act 4.3 (cont.)–4.4 (963–1190): trochaic septenarii (228 lines)

Trachalio and Gripus argue over the trunk; Daemones forces the girls to leave the house and sit on the altar; Trachalio and Gripus continue arguing until the contents are revealed and Daemones recognises his daughter.

=== Trachalio begs his freedom ===
- Act 4.5 (1191–1204): iambic senarii (14 lines)

Daemones speaks of his good fortune.

- Act 4.6 (1205–1226): trochaic septenarii (22 lines)

Daemones orders Trachalio to fetch Plesidippus with a message that he may marry Palaestra; Trachalio in turn begs Daemones to ask Plesiddipus to give him his freedom, so that he, Trachalio, can marry Ampelisca.

=== Gripus and Ampelisca are freed ===
- Act 4.7 (1227–1264): iambic senarii (38 lines)

Gripus advises Daemones to keep the money, but Daemones refuses his advice.

- Act 4.8 (1265–1280): trochaic septenarii (16 lines)

Trachalio brings Plesidippus, who is excited at the news.

- Act 5.1–5.2 (1281–1337): iambic septenarii (57 lines)

Labrax bemoans his ill luck. Gripus tells him about the chest, and offers to take him to it in return for a large reward.

- Act 5.2 (cont.) (1338–1356): iambic senarii (19 lines)

Gripus forces Labrax to swear on the altar that he will pay the reward.

- Act 5.3 (1357–1423): trochaic septenarii (67 lines)

Labrax tells Daemones he may keep Palaestra free of charge. Gripus demands his reward, which Labrax refuses, but Daemones insists the reward must be paid. He uses half to free Ampelisca, and half to buy Gripus's freedom.

== Modern versions ==
=== "A-21" ===
Louis Zukofsky included an adaptation of Rudens as section "A-21" in his long poem "A"; this adaptation was written in 1967.

=== The Storm ===
In July 2005, a new translation by Peter Oswald entitled The Storm was produced at Shakespeare's Globe Theatre in London as part of the "World and Underworld" Season.

=== Tug of War ===
In 2007, a translation by UCLA academic Amy Richlin formed the basis for Tug of War, performed at the Getty Villa in California.

== Translations ==
- Henry Thomas Riley, 1912
- Paul Nixon, 1916-38
- Cleveland K Chase, 1942
- E. F. Watling, 1964
- Christopher Stace, 1981
- Peter L. Smith. 1991
- Robert Wind, 1995
- Constance Carrier, 1995
- Peter Oswald, 2005.
- David M. Christenson, 2010
- Wolfgang de Melo, 2012

== Editions ==
- Plautus, Rudens, edited by H. C. Fay, Bristol Classical Press, Bristol, 1969, ISBN 0-86292-063-9.
