= Howard Boyd Turrentine =

American judge

Senior Judge of the United States District Court for the Southern District of California
- In office January 22, 1984 – August 20, 2010

Chief Judge of the United States District Court for the Southern District of California
- In office 1982–1984
- Preceded by: Edward Joseph Schwartz
- Succeeded by: Gordon Thompson Jr.

Judge of the United States District Court for the Southern District of California
- In office April 24, 1970 – January 22, 1984
- Appointed by: Richard Nixon
- Preceded by: Fred Kunzel
- Succeeded by: Rudi M. Brewster

Personal details
- Born: Howard Boyd Turrentine; January 22, 1914 Escondido, California, U.S.
- Died: August 20, 2010 (aged 96) Point Loma, California, U.S.
- Education: San Diego State College (A.B.); USC Gould School of Law (LL.B.)

Howard Boyd Turrentine (January 22, 1914 – August 20, 2010) was a United States district judge of the United States District Court for the Southern District of California.

== Education and career ==
Born in Escondido, California, Turrentine received an Artium Baccalaureus degree from San Diego State College in 1936 and a Bachelor of Laws from the USC Gould School of Law in 1939. He was in private practice in San Diego, California from 1939 to 1941, and was a deputy city attorney of San Diego from 1940 to 1941. He was a Lieutenant Commander in the United States Navy during World War II, from 1941 to 1945. He resumed his private practice in San Diego from 1945 to 1968, and was a member of the Selective Service Appeals Board in 1966. He was a judge of the Superior Court, County of San Diego from 1968 to 1970.

== Federal judicial service ==
On February 19, 1970, Turrentine was nominated by President Richard Nixon to a seat on the United States District Court for the Southern District of California vacated by Judge Fred Kunzel. Turrentine was confirmed by the United States Senate on April 23, 1970, and received his commission the following day. He served as Chief Judge from 1982 to 1984, assuming senior status on January 22, 1984, and serving in that status until his death on August 20, 2010, in Point Loma, California.

== Sources ==
Legal offices
Preceded by Fred Kunzel	Judge of the United States District Court for the Southern District of California; 1970–1984	Succeeded by Rudi M. Brewster
Preceded by Edward Joseph Schwartz	Chief Judge of the United States District Court for the Southern District of California; 1982–1984	Succeeded by Gordon Thompson Jr.
