= Israel Defense Forces parade =

Military parade in honour of Israel's independence

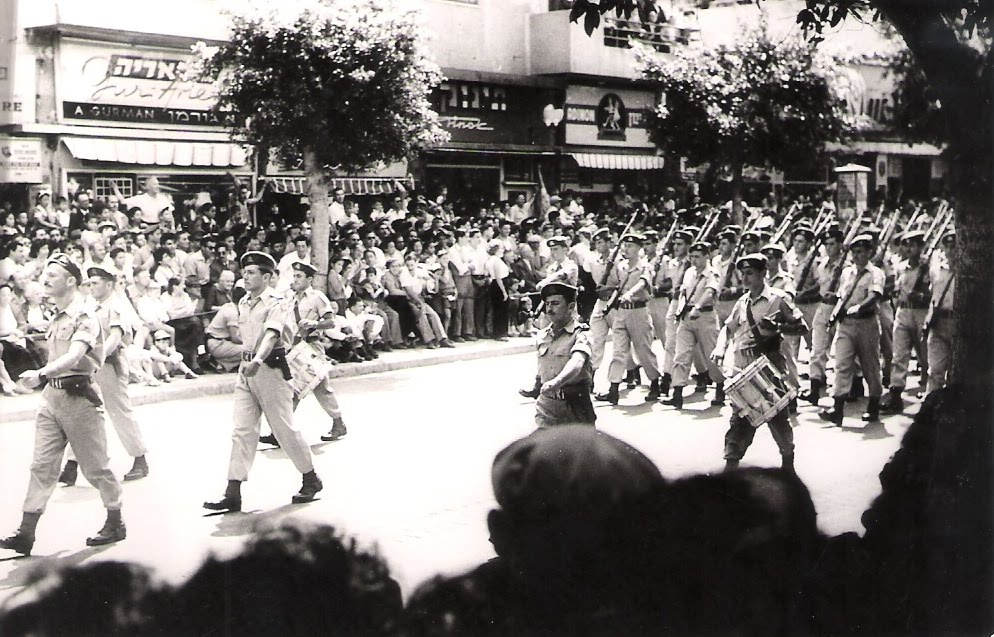
Israeli Independence Day military parade in 1956

The Israel Defense Forces parade was an event during the first 25 years of the State of Israel's existence to celebrate its military might. It was cancelled after 1973 due to financial concerns.

The first IDF parade took place during the 1948 Arab–Israeli War, on July 27, 1948, on Allenby Street and Ben Yehuda Street in Tel Aviv.

The second parade took place in 1949, on Israel's first independence day, in Tel Aviv. It failed in the process because the overenthusiastic crowd burst into the parade ground. It was nicknamed "The parade that did not march".

Starting with the third parade in 1950, annual parades were held on the country's independence day, ending in 1968. Citing financial concerns, it was then decided that the parade should only be held on special occasions. The last IDF parade thus took place in 1973, on Israel's 25th birthday.

The Israel Defense Forces still has weapon exhibitions country-wide on Independence Day, but they are stationary and have a limited scale. The first ever IDF parade in years was held on Jerusalem Day 1997 to mark the golden jubilee since independence and the 30th anniversary of the IDF capture of the Old City of Jerusalem.

== Parade locations ==
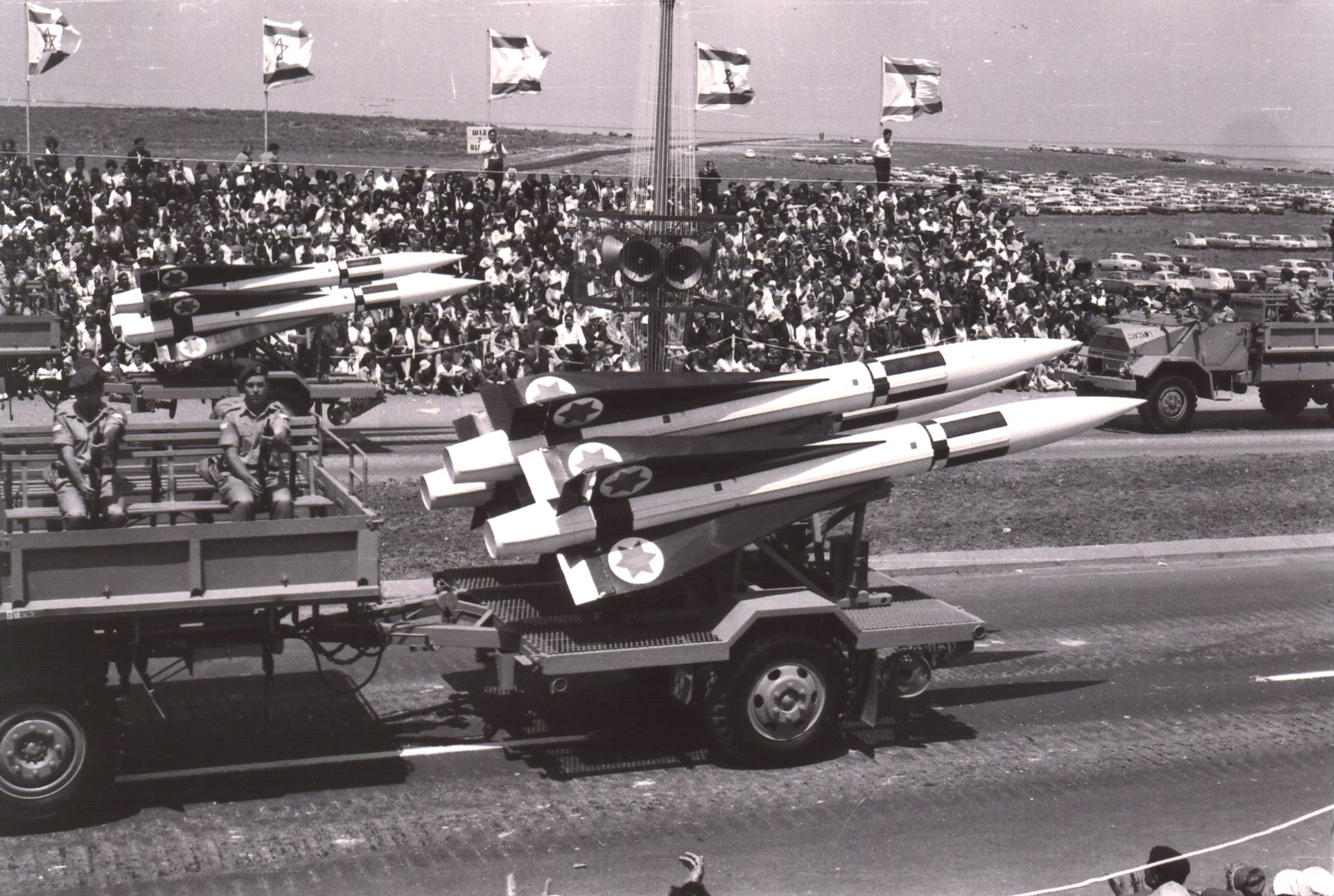
MIM-23 Hawk anti-aircraft missiles in a military parade in Tel Aviv, 1965

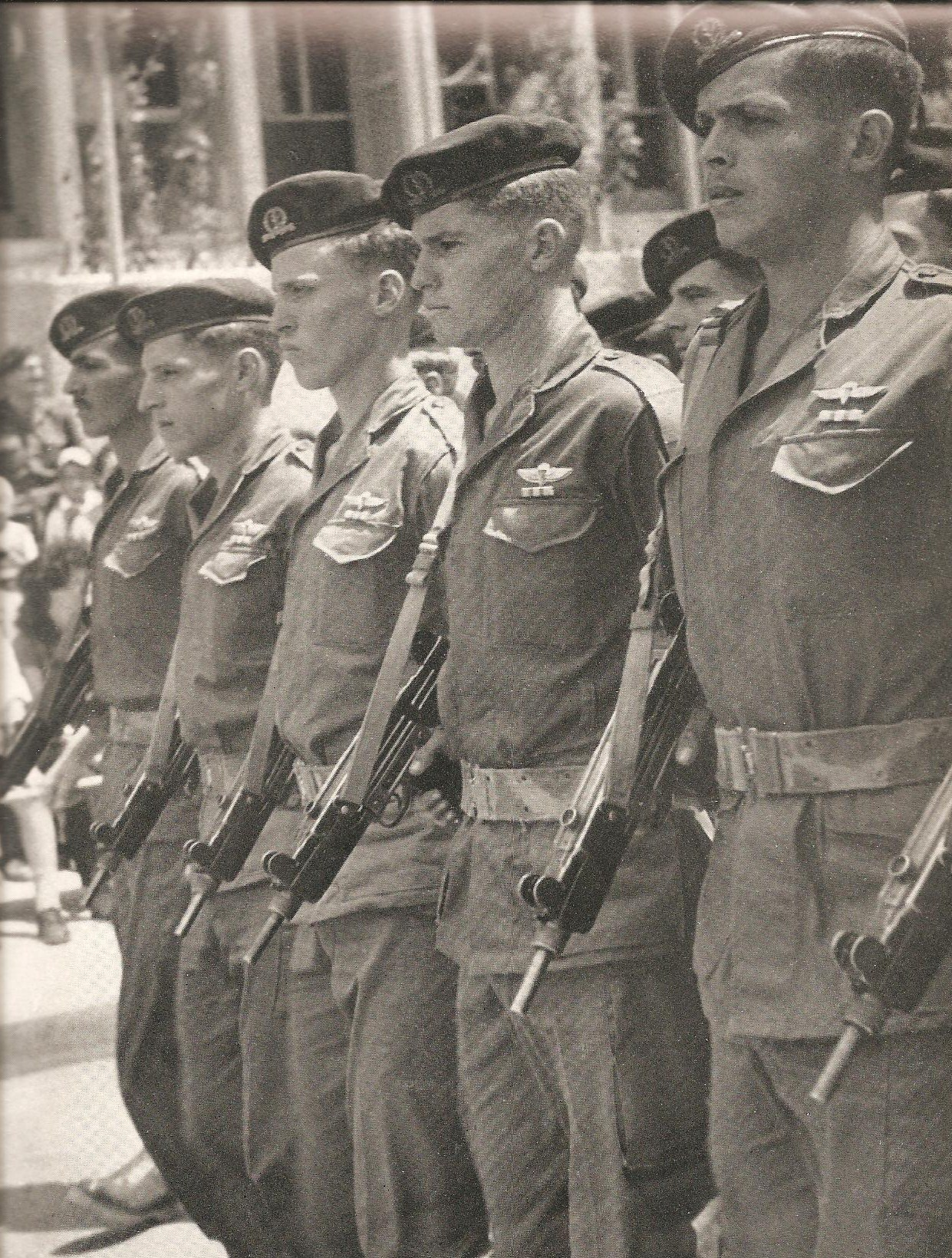
Israeli soldiers armed with Uzis at Independence Day, 1958

Year	Location
1948	Tel Aviv
1949	Tel Aviv
1950	Jerusalem
1951	Jerusalem
1952	Tel Aviv
1953	Haifa
1954	Ramla
1955	Tel Aviv, Beersheba, Afula
1956	Haifa
1957	Tel Aviv
1958	Jerusalem
1959	Tel Aviv
1960	Haifa
1961	Jerusalem
1962	Tel Aviv
1963	Haifa
1964	Beersheba
1965	Tel Aviv
1966	Haifa
1967	Jerusalem
1968	Jerusalem
1973	Jerusalem
