= Harry Aaron Hollzer =

American judge

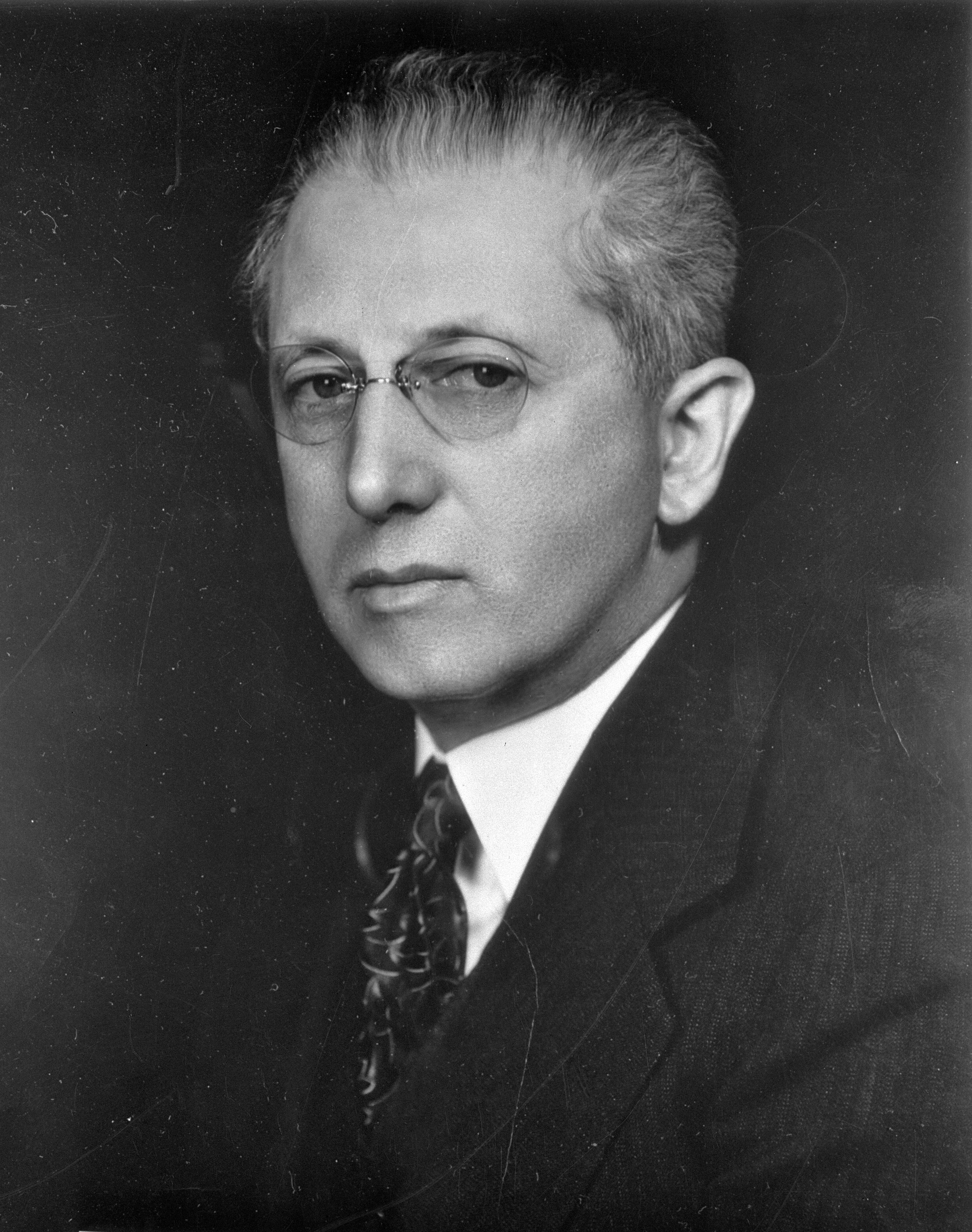

Judge of the United States District Court for the Southern District of California
- In office March 3, 1931 – January 14, 1946
- Appointed by: Herbert Hoover
- Preceded by: Seat established by 46 Stat. 819
- Succeeded by: Jacob Weinberger

Judge of the Los Angeles County Superior Court
- In office May 24, 1924 – March 2, 1931
- Appointed by: Friend William Richardson
- Preceded by: John W. Shenk
- Succeeded by: Lester W. Roth

Personal details
- Born: Harry Aaron Hollzer; November 4, 1880 New York City, US
- Died: January 14, 1946 (aged 65) Los Angeles, California, US
- Resting place: Home of Peace Memorial Park; Los Angeles, California
- Education: UC Berkeley School of Law (LL.B.)

Harry Aaron Hollzer (November 4, 1880 – January 14, 1946) was a United States district judge of the United States District Court for the Southern District of California.

== Education and career ==
Hollzer was born in New York City, New York, on November 4, 1880, the son of Joseph and Annie Hollzer, and in 1885, the family moved to San Francisco, California. When his father died in 1890, his mother, unable to care for her six children who ranged in age from two to fourteen years, sent Harry and his four brothers to live at the Pacific Hebrew Orphan Asylum in San Francisco, while her one daughter, Esther, aged ten years, remained at home. It was at the orphanage that Hollzer decided to become a lawyer. He was educated in San Francisco public schools, including Lowell High School, and earned his Bachelor of Laws from UC Berkeley School of Law in 1903, one of the first three students to earn that degree at that institution. Graduating with honors, he completed a six-year program in only five years. He had been admitted to the California bar in 1902, and practiced law in San Francisco until he moved to Los Angeles in 1909 where he became associated with W. Ona Morton. In 1912, the firm name was changed to Morton, Hollzer & Morton.

== Superior Court of California service ==
Hollzer was appointed to a Superior Court judgeship by Governor Friend William Richardson in 1924 to replace Judge John W. Shenk, who had been elevated to the California State Supreme Court. "It was a surprise to me," Hollzer said, "for I was not a candidate." He was elected to that post in November of that year and reelected in 1926. In 1930, he served as a justice pro tem of the District Court of Appeals of California. From 1926 to 1931, he was a member of the Judicial Council of California, serving as its director of survey and research. In early 1928, Governor C.C. Young directed Judge Hollzer to take two months to travel throughout the country and survey systems employed in court administration and procedural rules in order to improve judicial methods in California. The Council's and Judge Hollzer's efforts sped up justice 106 percent in Los Angeles County while increasing judges' salaries by only 50 percent. From 1929 to 1931, he was the chairman of the National Conference of Judicial Councils.

== Federal judicial service ==
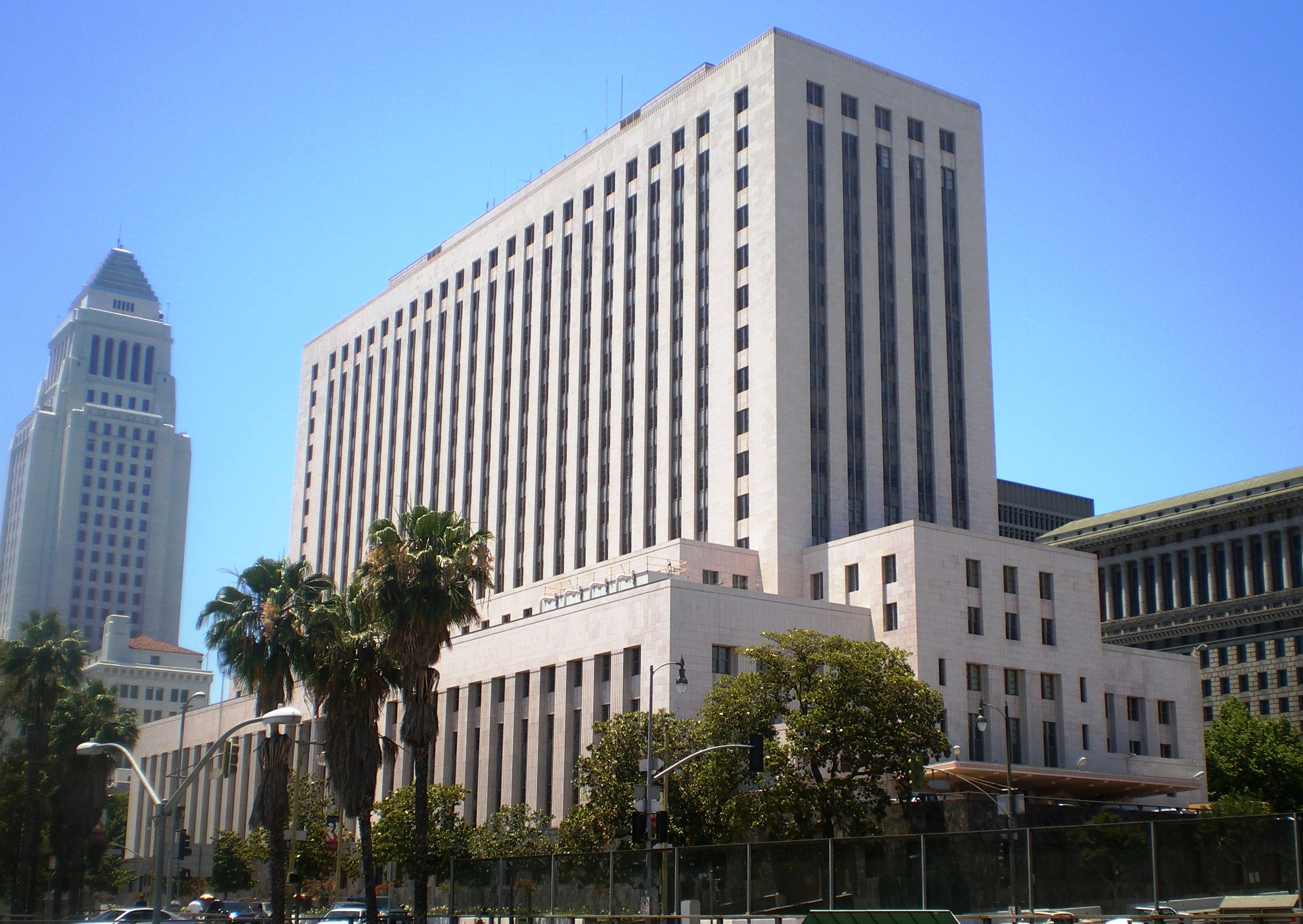
The U.S. District Courthouse in Los Angeles, where Judge Hollzer served the last years of his appointment

Hollzer was nominated by President Herbert Hoover on January 8, 1931, to the United States District Court for the Southern District of California, to a new seat authorized by 46 Stat. 819. Upon learning of his nomination, he said, "One of the greatest thrills in life is to receive an expression of confidence such as this." He was confirmed by the United States Senate on February 27, 1931, and received his commission on March 3, 1931. He served in that capacity until his death on January 14, 1946.

=== Legal fraternity membership ===
In May 1931, Hollzer was initiated as an honorary member of Lambda Gamma Phi, the national professional commerce and law organization fraternity.

=== Notable cases ===
As a Los Angeles-based federal judge, Hollzer adjudicated several cases involving Hollywood celebrities, including Clara Bow, Mae West, and Hedy Lamarr, and he swore Marlene Dietrich in as a citizen of the United States in 1939. In a 1943 case concerning the purchase of tires allegedly against rationing rules, Hollzer heard testimony from directors Victor Fleming and Howard Hawks, and comedian James Jordan (better known as Fibber McGee).

== Illness and death ==
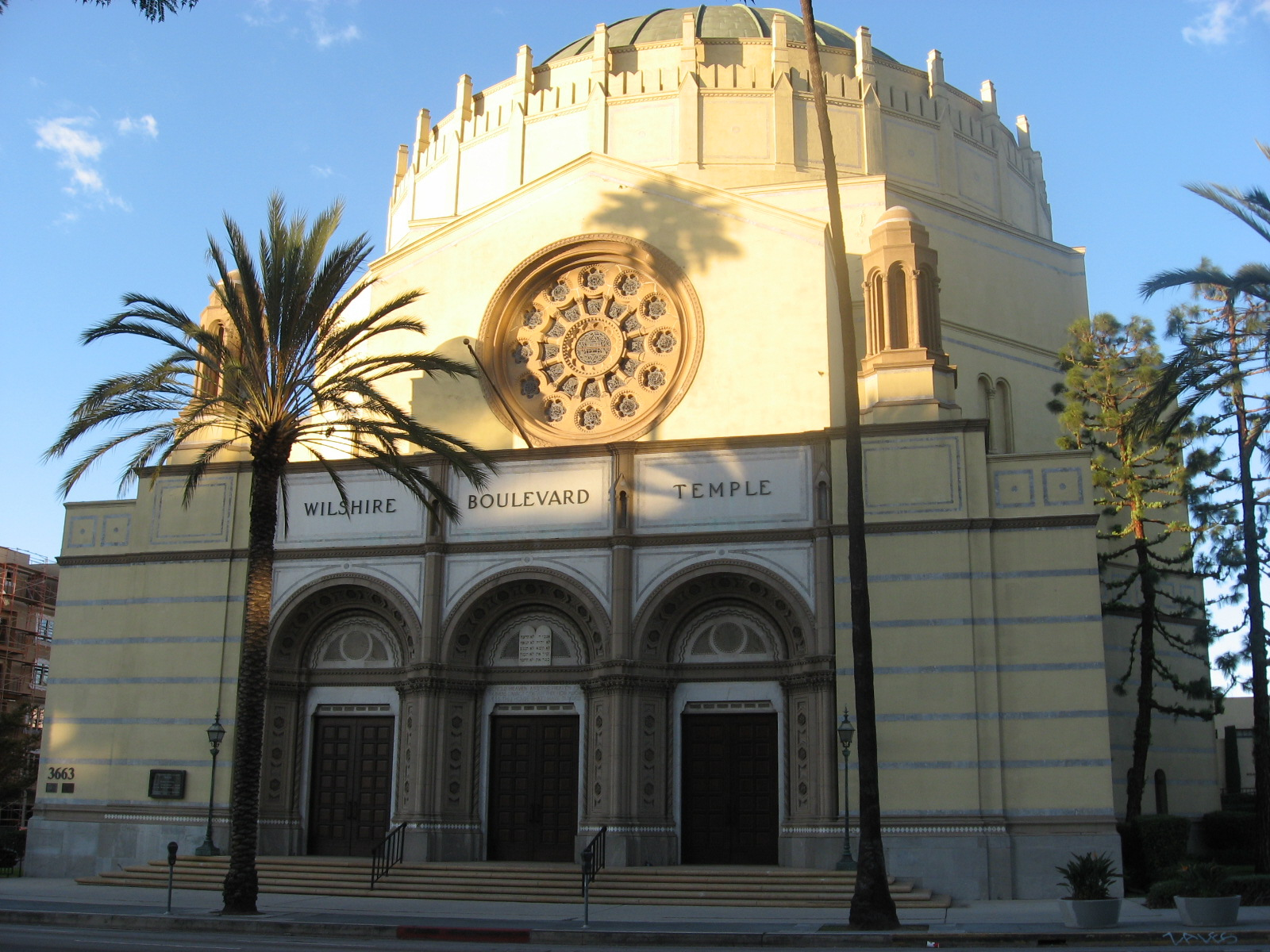
The Wilshire Boulevard Temple, where Hollzer served as president and his funeral was held

On January 3, 1946, after attending a dinner party at the home of his lifelong friend, Rabbi Edgar Magnin, Hollzer suffered a heart attack and was hospitalized. He died of complications resulting from the flu on January 14 at Cedars of Lebanon Hospital. He was survived by his widow, Louise, whom he married in 1907, a daughter, Alma (Mrs. Oscar) Srere, and a son, U.S. Army Corporal Herbert Maurice Hollzer. Fellow judges, attorneys, and civic leaders attended the funeral, held at the Wilshire Boulevard Temple, as did a number of film executives, headed by MGM boss Louis B. Mayer.

In March, hundreds of Hollzer's friends and associates gathered to pay tribute to him in the courtroom of Senior United States Judge Paul J. McCormick, where the judge "recalled to the throng how Hollzer's career showed democracy at work in the United States – how he worked his way up from an orphanage to a flourishing law practice, judge of the Superior Court, and finally to the United States District Court."

== Memorials ==
=== House Resolution No. 47 – Relative to the Passing of Judge Harry A. Hollzer ===
On January 18, 1946, during the 56th (1st Extraordinary) Session, the California State Assembly unanimously adopted the following resolution:

With sincere regret the Members of the Assembly have learned of the passing in Los Angeles on January 15, 1946, of the Honorable Harry A. Hollzer, Judge of the United States District Court for the Southern District of California.

His distinguished record as a jurist covered a span of over 20 years, first as a Judge of the Superior Court in and for the County of Los Angeles and thereafter as a member of the Federal Bench, to which he was appointed by President Hoover in 1931.

Nor were his services to the people confined to matters judicial. Throughout the course of his 65 years he devoted himself earnestly to bettering the welfare of his fellow men, taking an active part in community and National philanthropy and serving as President of the Los Angeles Jewish Community Council and Wilshire Boulevard Temple. Raised himself in an orphanage and making his own way in the world, he never lost touch with the common people nor failed them in time of need.

The passing of Judge Hollzer has occasioned widespread tribute to his memory, in which the Assembly of California joins; now, therefore, be it

Resolved by the Assembly of the State of California, That when the Assembly this day adjourns it shall do so in deference and respect to the memory of Judge Harry A. Hollzer; and be it further

Resolved, That the Chief Clerk is directed to transmit copies of this resolution to Mrs. Louise Hollzer, the bereaved widow of Judge Hollzer, to their daughter, Mrs. Oscar Srere, and to their son, Corporal Herbert M. Hollzer of the United States Army.

=== The Judge Harry A. Hollzer Memorial Award ===
The Judge Harry A. Hollzer Memorial Award, established shortly after his death, was awarded annually until the mid-1990s by the Jewish Federation Council of Greater Los Angeles to the individual "who has made the greatest contribution for better understanding between all peoples in the community." Recipients include Frank Sinatra (1948), Harry and Jack L. Warner (1949), Chet Huntley (1955), Governor Edmund G. "Pat" Brown (1959), United States Senator Thomas Kuchel (1963), Los Angeles Times publisher Otis Chandler (1965), and University of Southern California President Steven Sample.

== Recognition ==
"Judge Harry A Hollzer is today considered the most lovable personality among the Jews on the Pacific Coast....That he will be re-elected to the bench in the August primaries is the wish of all citizens and elements in the community."

"He is a man of sterling character, is an exemplar of the noblest traditions of the legal profession and is greatly esteemed by all who know him."

"The bench and bar have lost an honored member of the legal profession."

"Judge Hollzer was the kind of citizen America needs in this trying period of our history. A lover of mankind and devoted to every worthwhile cause, he literally shortened his life by his unselfish service. He was the kind of man who was sensitive to the sufferings of people. As a judge on the bench, he was known to all his colleagues and those who came under the sphere of his influence and personality, for his passionate love of justice."

"Proctors always found him courteous, patient, and attentive. His courtroom was maintained in an atmosphere of quiet dignity....Judge Hollzer was an extremely hard worker, and many weekends and holidays found him in his chambers. Yet, even when the pressure of court business became extremely heavy...he never lost his unfailing courtesy and patience....We who knew him will long remember him with respect and affection. May more like Harry Hollzer ascend the bench in years to come."

"Harry Hollzer has left this world but he has not departed from the hearts of the countless numbers who knew and loved him. He still lives as a part of the Jewish community, the community to whose building and development he gave so much of himself. His memory will remain fresh so long as there are men and women who love their fellow beings, who understand and appreciate the beauties, the privileges and responsibilities of Judaism, who know the blessing of giving and the exaltation of service."

== Other Offices and Positions Held ==
Hollzer was a Scottish Rite Mason, Shriner, and an Elk. During his life, he had served as trustee, University Religious Conference; president, Los Angeles Jewish Community Council; president, Wilshire Boulevard Temple; president, Council of Jewish Federations and Welfare Funds, Western States Region; director, American Judicature Society; secretary, judicial section, American Bar Association; member, advisory board, Selective Draft Board, Los Angeles, 1917–1918; member, executive board, U.S.O.

== Sources ==
- "Hollzer, Harry Aaron - Federal Judicial Center". www.fjc.gov.

Legal offices
Preceded by Seat established by 46 Stat. 819	Judge of the United States District Court for the Southern District of California; 1931–1946	Succeeded by Jacob Weinberger
