= Manie Sacks =

American music and television executive

- Born: January 30, 1902
- Died: February 9, 1958 (aged 56)
- Occupations: talent agent, A&R
- Labels: RCA, Columbia

Emanuel "Manie" Sacks (January 30, 1902 – February 9, 1958) was an American music and television executive who worked for Columbia Records, RCA Victor and NBC. He worked closely with artists such as George Burns, Jack Benny, Dinah Shore, Harry James and others. In 1942, Sacks helped start Frank Sinatra's solo career and became a close friend.

== Early life ==
Sacks grew up in Philadelphia in a Jewish household. He enrolled in Pennsylvania Military Preparatory School (PMPS) in 1918 and became a cadet in 1920. He played on the football team and graduated class of 1924. Sacks briefly worked for his father's company as a clothing salesman but left to go into the entertainment business.

== Career ==
Sacks worked at WCAU in Philadelphia in public relations and as head of the Artists Bureau. In 1936, he left to become an agent for the Music Corporation of America in New York City. He booked appearances for celebrities and tended to personal and professional issues. While at MCA, Sacks met and became friends with Jack Benny. He worked at MCA for seven years.

=== Columbia ===
In 1940, Sacks became vice president at Columbia Records in charge of pop music artists. His job included picking songs, singers, bandleaders and arrangers. He was 39 when World War II started which meant he was not drafted and instead stayed in New York working with artists such as Frank Sinatra, Dinah Shore, Harry James and Doris Day.

When Sacks moved to Columbia Records, he convinced Benny to move his show (which had high ratings) from NBC to CBS. Benny recommended his friends George Burns and Edgar Bergen switch also. The programs helped CBS become the top-rated network.

Sacks signed trumpet player Harry James to Columbia and helped James change his image. It led to James becoming an actor on romantic movies where he met his future wife, Betty Grable. Sacks was the best man at their wedding and the godfather of their first child.

Long-playing records (LP) were introduced while Sacks was vice-president at Columbia. The first LP release was "The Voice of Frank Sinatra" in July 1948.

=== NBC and RCA Victor ===
In February 1950, Sacks was hired as Director of Artist Relations of RCA Victor. In December 1950 he was named Staff Vice President. In January 1953, he was named vice president and general manager of RCA Victor. In August 1953, he was Staff Vice President of NBC (in addition to his two other positions). He led RCA during their first releases of stereo albums to the market.

In November 1956, he was promoted to vice president, NBC Television Network, Talent and Programs.

== Frank Sinatra ==
In 1942, Sacks helped Sinatra get out of his contract with Tommy Dorsey. In return, Sinatra signed with Columbia. The two became close friends. In a CBS television tribute, Sinatra said, "There’s a little bit of Manie in everything good that has ever happened to me … Whenever I was in trouble and needed help, I yelled for Manie."

Sinatra also said of Sacks, "At my time of life I look back, and I can count on the fingers of one hand the people who were true friends. Manie and his brother Lester were two of those. They never tried to exploit me."

When Sacks found out he had leukemia (at 52 years old), he only told his family and Sinatra. Sinatra flew to Philadelphia to be with Sacks the day before he died.

== Personal life ==
Sacks was never married. In addition to his close friendship with Sinatra, he was close friends with businessman John B. Kelly Sr. Kelly considered Sacks part of the family. Sacks was president of Beth Israel Synagogue in Philadelphia and on the board of directors of the Albert Einstein Medical Center in Philadelphia. He was also a trustee of the Pennsylvania Military College. In 1953, he was named Philadelphia's Man of the Year.

== Legacy ==
After his death, NBC aired a 90-minute telecast in honor of Sacks. Performers included Bob Hope, Sid Caesar, Rosemary Clooney, Perry Como, Dinah Shore, Frank Sinatra, Jack Webb, Betty Grable, Nat King Cole, and Perry Como. The performers all worked for union minimum so the excess (over $200,000) could be donated to the Emanuel Sacks Foundation.

In 1959, the Albert Einstein Medical Center in Philadelphia dedicated the Emanuel Sacks Hematology Department in his honor.
