= Los Angeles United States Court House =

Los Angeles United States Court House may refer to:

- United States Courthouse (Spring Street, Los Angeles)
- Edward R. Roybal Federal Building and United States Courthouse
- United States Courthouse (First Street, Los Angeles), 350 W. 1st St, at Broadway/Hill, opened 2016
