= List of federal buildings in Los Angeles County =

Federal court and agency buildings

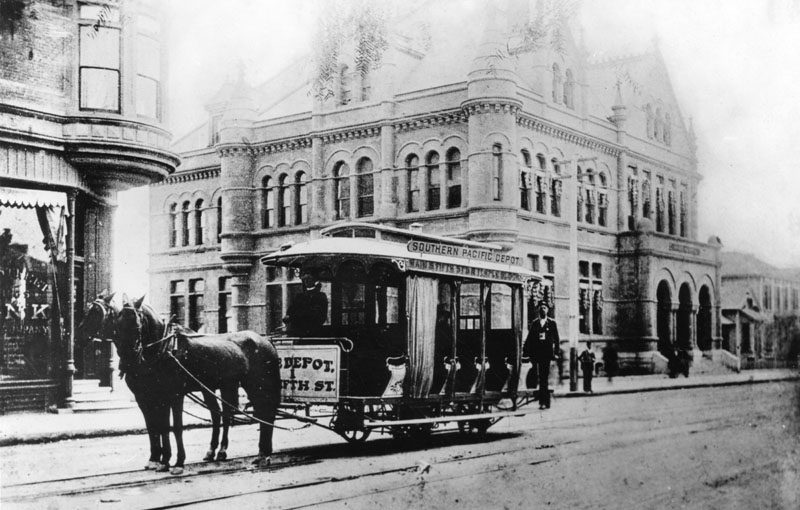
Horse-drawn streetcar in front of the first Los Angeles federal courthouse and post office, c. 1892

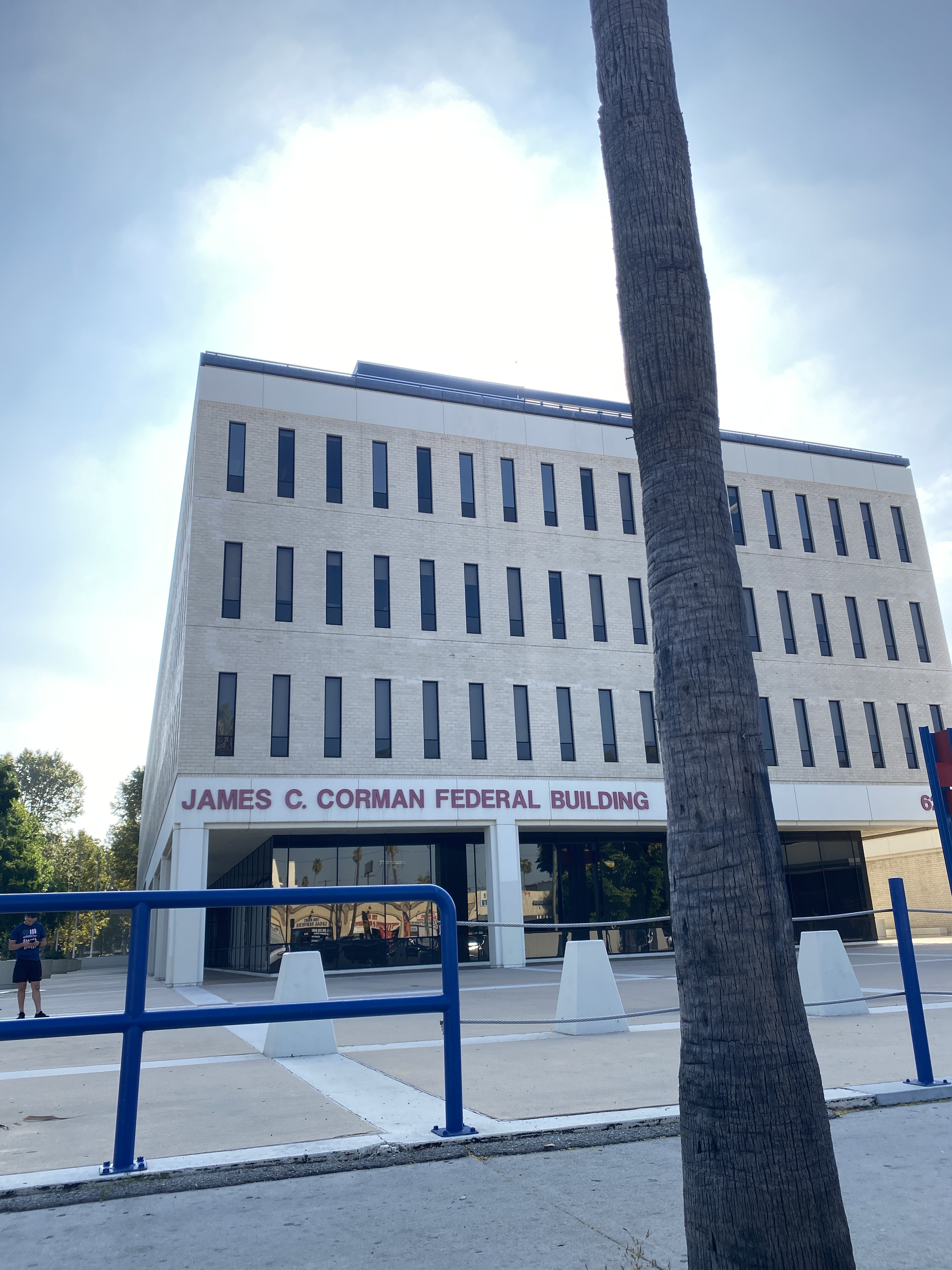
James C. Corman Federal Building at Van Nuys Government Center

This is a list of Los Angeles federal buildings, meaning past or present United States federal buildings located within the city of Los Angeles. It includes buildings that, prior to the creation of the USPS as an independent agency in 1971, contained post offices but no buildings that were exclusively post offices.) Since 1974, the General Services Administration manages most federal buildings:

== Existing ==
=== Downtown Los Angeles ===
- Federal Reserve Bank of San Francisco, Los Angeles Branch, 409 W. Olympic Blvd., opened 1929, NRHP, original building is now residential, bank operations are in 1988 building next door
- Spring Street Courthouse, 312 Spring St., NRHP, federal courthouse 1940 to 2016, now county courthouse, still houses other federal departments
- 300 North Los Angeles Street Federal Building, across the street from Roybal, opened 1965, NRHP
- Edward R. Roybal Federal Building and U.S. Courthouse, 255 E Temple St., opened 1996
- First Street U.S. Courthouse, the newest federal courthouse in Los Angeles, located 350 W. First St., open since 2016

=== Other neighborhoods ===
- Wilshire Federal Building, 11000 Wilshire Blvd., NRHP, opened 1969
- James C. Corman Federal Building, 6230 Van Nuys Blvd. at Van Nuys Government Center, opened 1974

== Demolished ==
- U.S. Post Office and Courthouse (1892) - First Los Angeles federal building, Main and Winston, in use 1892 to ~1901, demolished
- U.S. Post Office and Courthouse (1910) - Second Los Angeles federal building, 312 Spring St., in use beginning 1910, demolished 1934; Spring Street Courthouse built on same location

== See also ==
- List of United States post offices § California (NRHP)
- List of United States federal courthouses in California
