= Klinkert =

Klinkert is a surname. Notable people with the surname include:

- Brigitte Klinkert (born 1956), French politician
- H. C. Klinkert (1829–1913), Dutch Mennonite missionary
- Michael Klinkert (born 1968), German footballer

== See also ==
- Klinker
