= Tajo Building =

Structure in downtown Los Angeles (1898–1940)

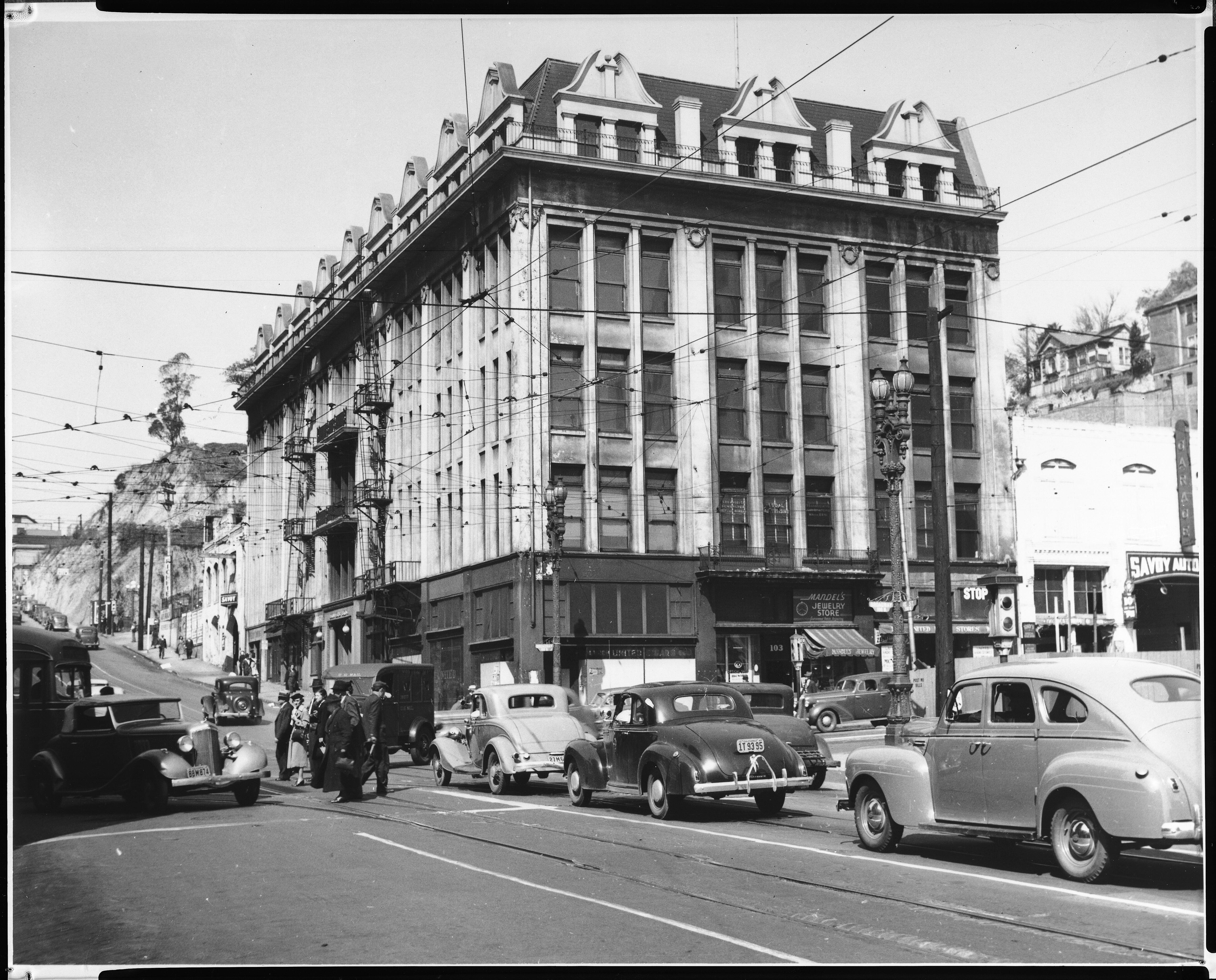
- Tajo Building, late 1930s
- Interactive map of the Tajo Building area
- Alternative names: Tajo Block, Klinker Building

General information
- Location: 307 W. First Street, Los Angeles, California, United States
- Coordinates: 34.0543724°N 118.245567°W
- Opened: 1898
- Demolished: 1940

Technical details
- Floor count: 5, plus basement

Design and construction
- Architects: George Herbert Wyman, William Lee Woollett

The Tajo Building was a six-story office building on the northwest corner of First and Broadway in downtown Los Angeles, California, in the United States. The building was developed by Simona Martinez Bradbury and named for the Bradbury family's Tajo silver mine in Mexico. The Tajo Building was occupied at various times by the USC Law School, the Los Angeles Stock Exchange and, for the first decade of the 1900s, the United States District Court for the Southern District of California.

== History ==
After the death of Lewis Bradbury in 1892, Martinez Bradbury took over the family business, oversaw the completion of the Bradbury Building, and developed the Tajo Building on the northwest corner of First and Broadway. The building briefly hosted the Los Angeles Stock Exchange from 1900 to 1901.

The federal district court was ensconced at the Tajo for nearly a decade because the original federal courthouse had been partially demolished in anticipation of a potential expansion in 1901. (The expansion never came to pass.) The new courthouse, which was located on the same site as today's Spring Street Courthouse, was not completed until 1910. In the interregnum, Judge Wellborn and company ruled from the fourth floor of the Tajo Building. The United States Marshals were also housed in the Tajo Building during this time.

The Tajo Building was located across from the original Los Angeles Times building. The force of the 1910 L.A. Times bombing broke "every window in the east side of the Tajo building...Several offices were damaged extensively by water and smoke, while the awnings of the building were burned off. The principal damage to the buildings was from breakage of plate glass windows. It is estimated that US$10,000 (Note: Inflation calculation, 1910 to present: US$10,000 (equivalent to about $345,540 in 2025)) worth of plate glass was destroyed by the explosion."

USC's Law School used the building between 1911 and 1925. An elevator accident in the building in 1914 injured 21 people, including several USC Law students who had just left a torts class. The offices of the Mexican consulate were located in the Tajo Building 1922–23. In the late 1920s, the Tajo Building was bought by L.W. Klinker and became known as the Klinker Building. The City of Los Angeles acquired the property around 1936 to allow for the widening of First Street. As part of a three-way property swap circa 1937, the city deeded the building to the county. The Tajo Building was demolished in 1940. The Los Angeles County Law Library now occupies the site where the Tajo Building once stood.

== Architecture ==
George H. Wyman "prepared the drawings" for the Tajo Block. The contractor was Louis Jacobi.

The building had five floors and a basement. According to the Pacific Coast Architecture Database:

The Tajo Building had a stone front facade over a brick structure. Retail stores occupied the first floor of the 1st Avenue facade, while offices stood on the floors above. The 1st Street facade contained nine bays, each having triplets of double-hung windows on floors two through four. The first floor entryway was located in the center, with four bays located on either side. A balcony separated the fourth and fifth floors, with an iron railing running the width of the building. The top floor had a succession of nine wall dormers, each with a tall swan's neck broken pediment gracing it. These dormers were the most notable decorative feature of the Tajo Block.

== Additional images ==
Tajo Building (1898–1940)
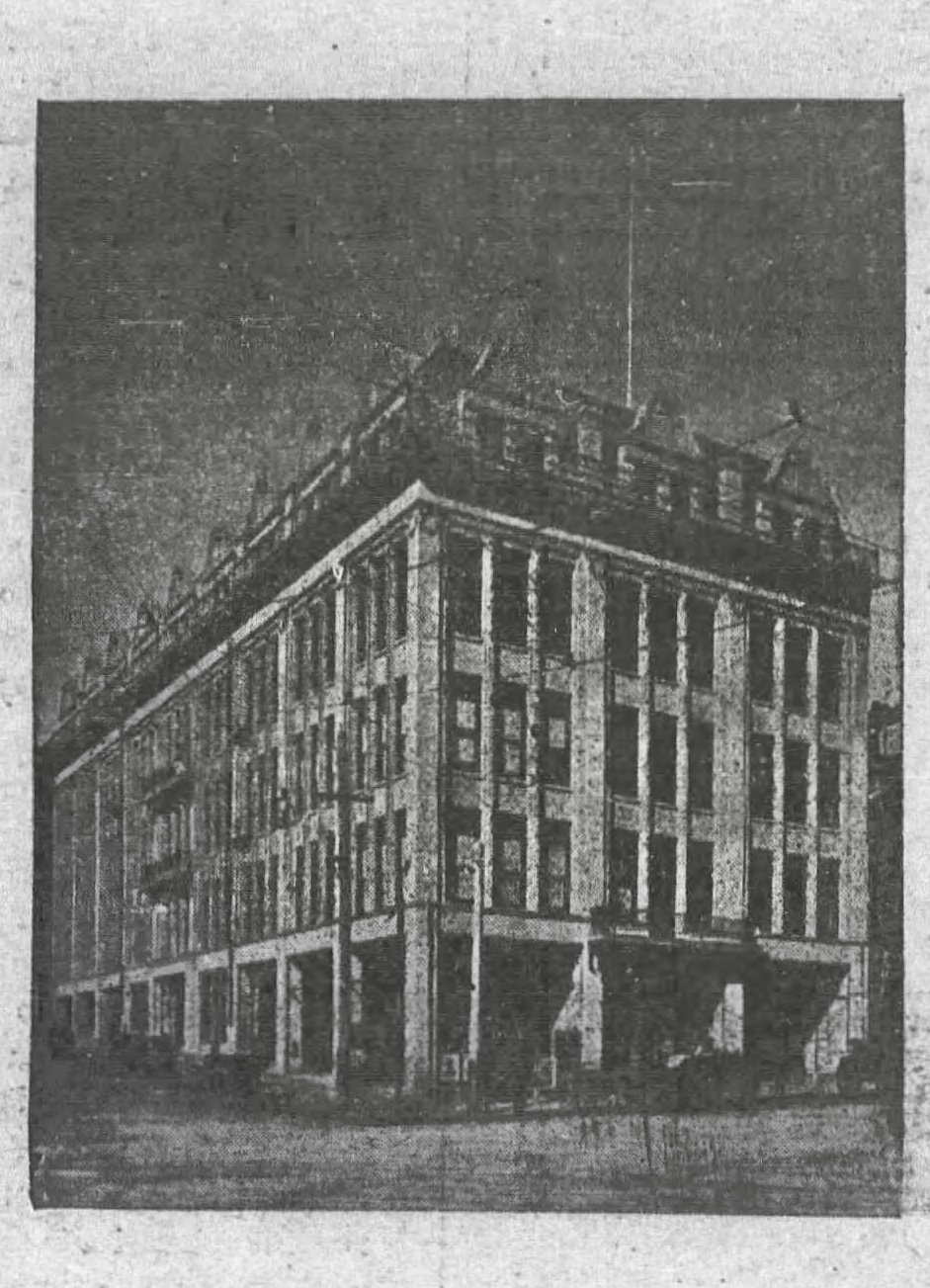
Los Angeles Times, Jan. 1, 1899

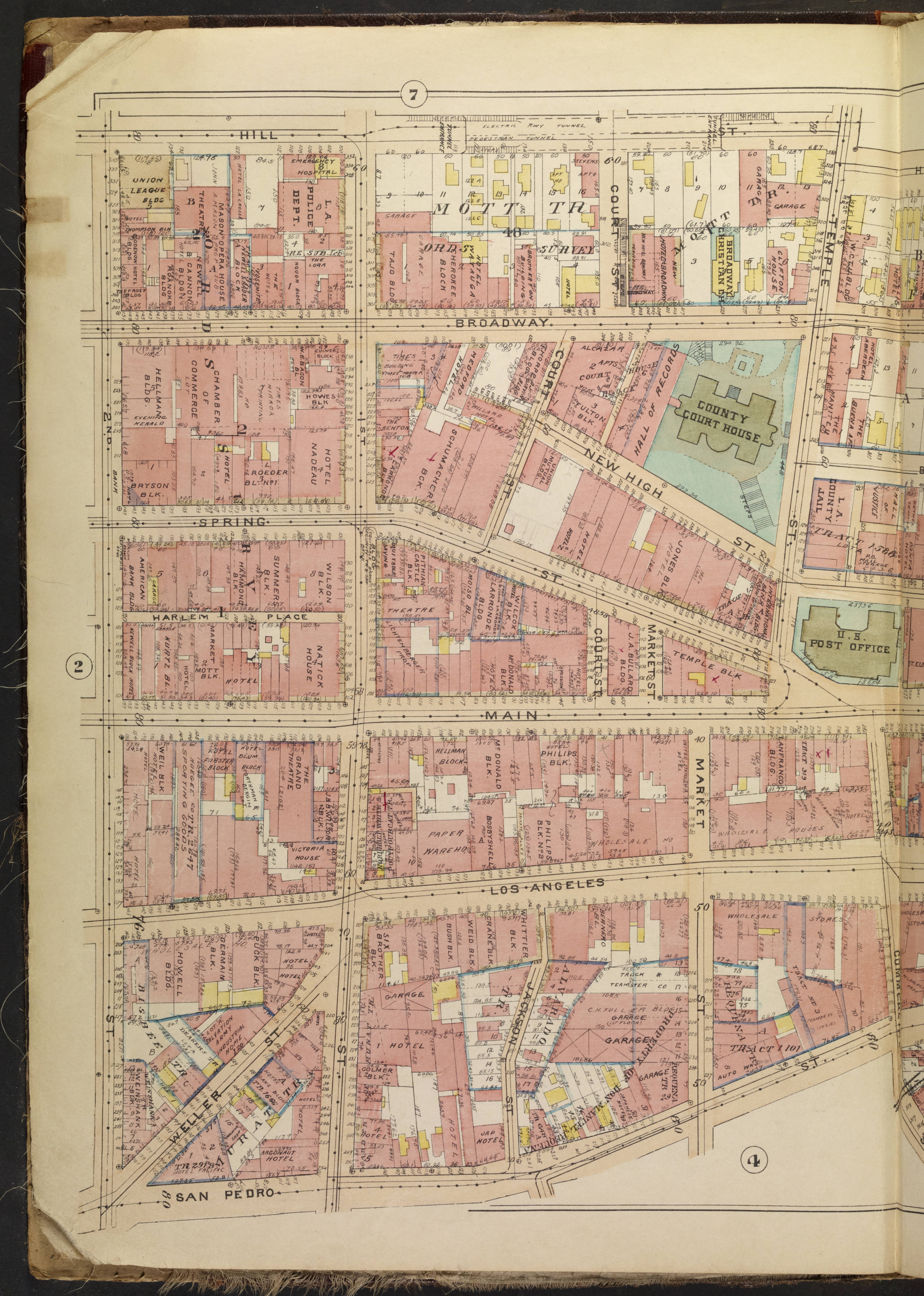
Tajo Building and neighbors, 1921

== See also ==
- List of United States federal courthouses in California
