= Klinker =

Klinker is a surname. Notable people with the surname include:

- Eric Klinker, American technology executive
- Gudrun J. Klinker (born 1958), German computer scientist
- Lewis William Klinker (1867–1946), American businessman, author, lecturer and public figure
- Orpha Klinker (1891–1964), American artist
- Sheila Klinker (born 1938), American politician
- Umberto Klinker, Surinamese football player
