= Spring Street Courthouse =

- U.S. National Register of Historic Places
- U.S. National Historic Landmark
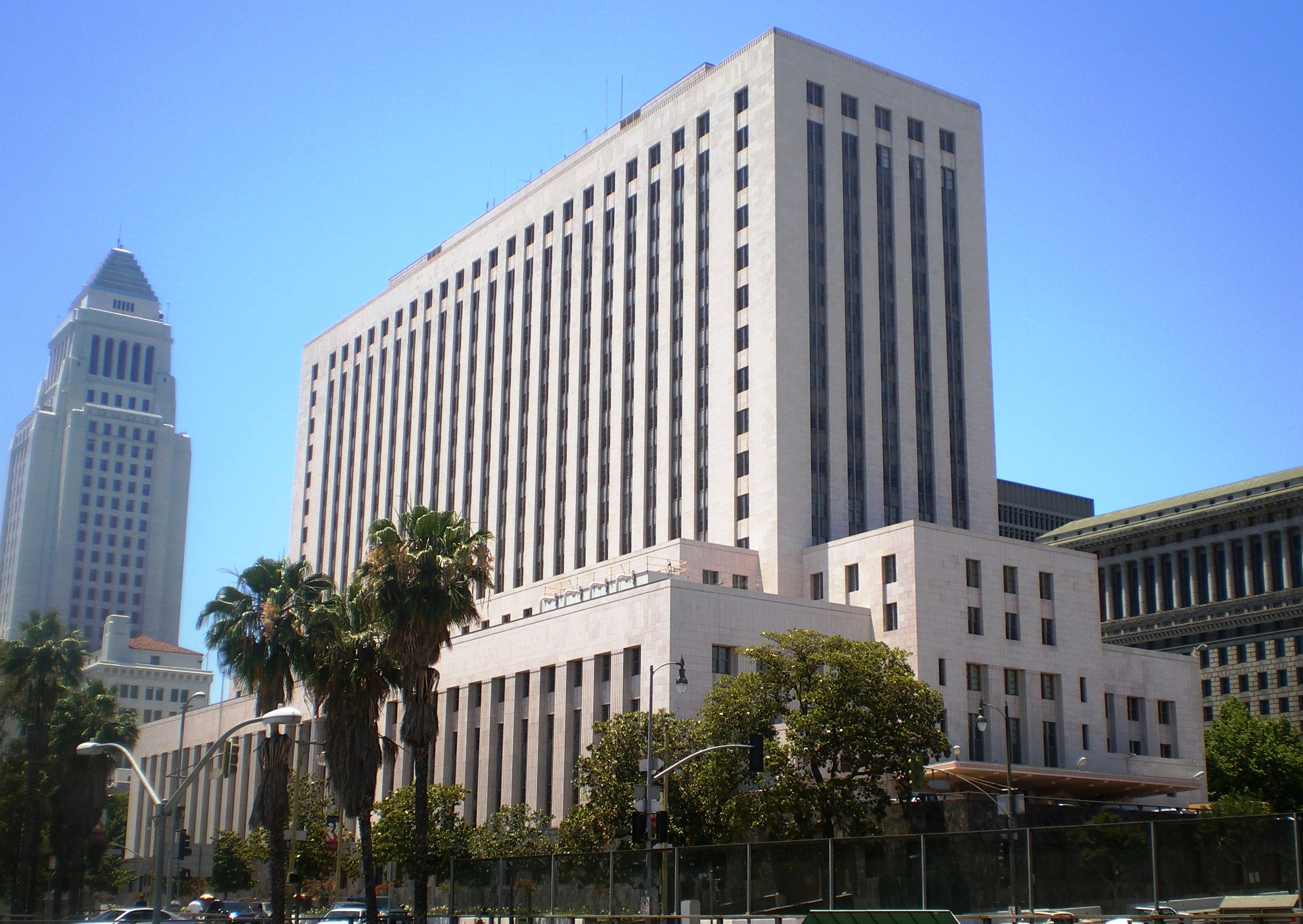
- U.S. Court House shown with Los Angeles City Hall tower in background, 2008

- Location within California
- Location: 312 North Spring Street; Los Angeles, California
- Coordinates: 34.0550°N 118.2414°W
- Architect: Gilbert Stanley Underwood; Louis A. Simon
- Architectural style: Moderne
- NRHP reference No.: 06000001

Significant dates
- Added to NRHP: February 9, 2006
- Designated NHL: October 16, 2012

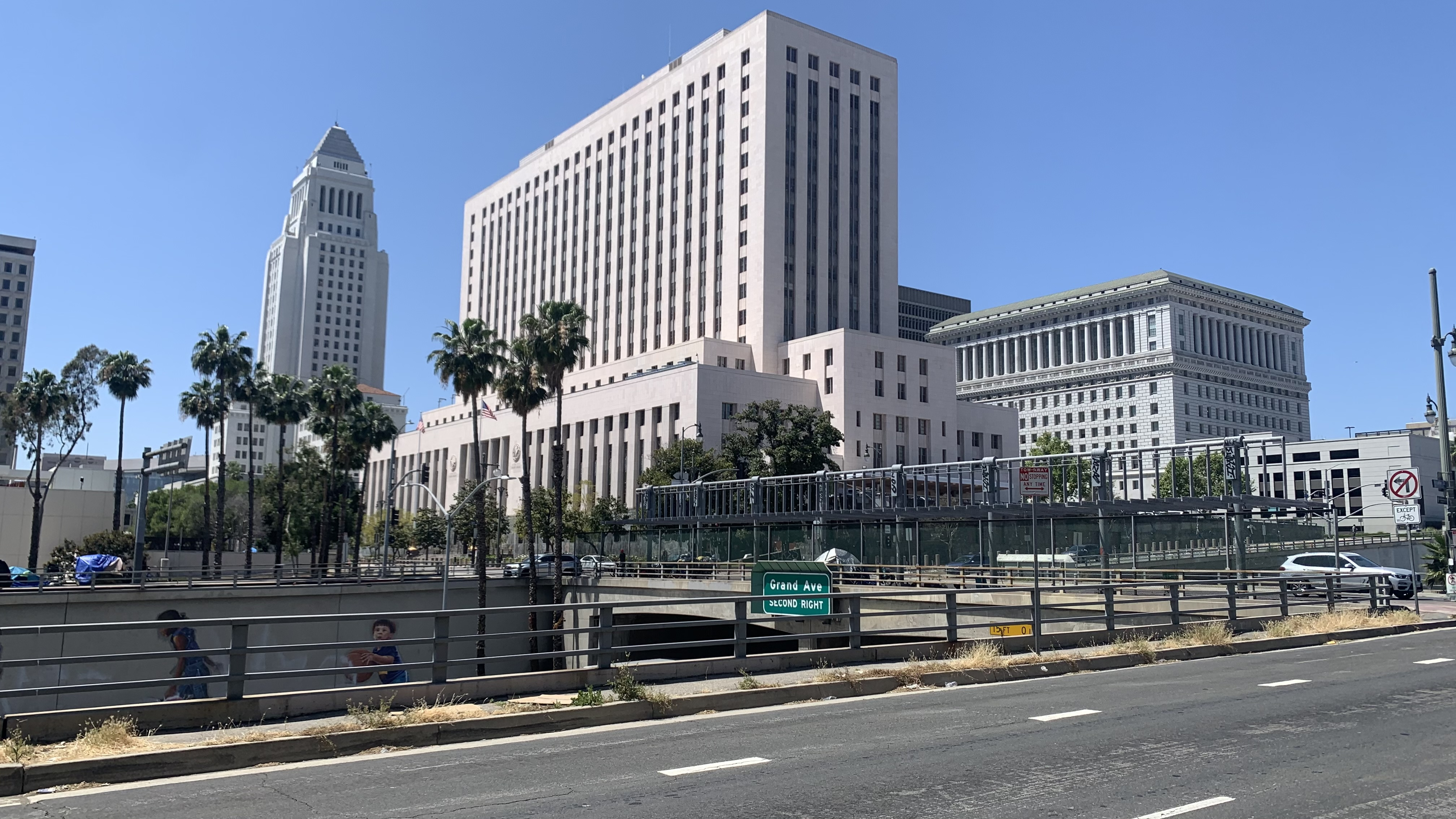
Spring Street Courthouse in 2022

The Spring Street Courthouse, formerly the United States Court House in Downtown Los Angeles, is a Moderne style building that originally served as both a post office and a courthouse. The building was designed by Gilbert Stanley Underwood and Louis A. Simon, and construction was completed in 1940. It formerly housed federal courts but is now used by Los Angeles Superior Court.

The United States Court House initially housed court facilities for the United States District Court for the Southern District of California, until the District was redrawn in 1966. It thereafter functioned as a court house with judges from the United States District Court for the Central District of California. In 2016 the federal courts moved to the new First Street Courthouse. There is another federal court house in the Roybal Building in Downtown Los Angeles. In February 2006, it was listed on the National Register of Historic Places as U.S. Court House and Post Office. It was designated a National Historic Landmark in 2012, as the site of Gonzalo Mendez et al v. Westminster School District of Orange County, et al, a major legal case in advancing the civil rights of Mexican-Americans, and a precursor to the landmark Brown v. Board of Education case.

== Building history ==
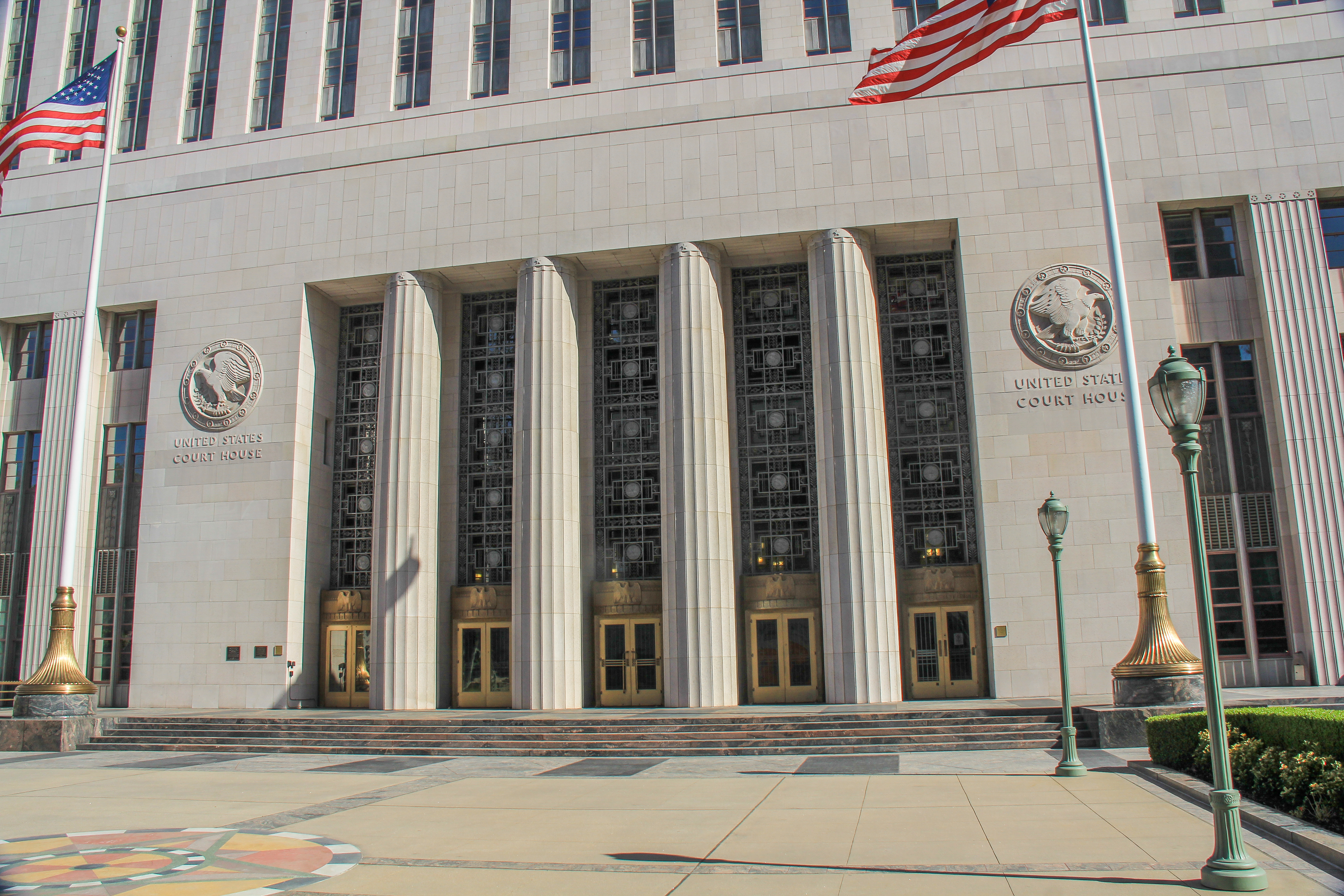
U.S. Court House and Post Office, 312 N. Spring St.

Built between 1937 and 1940 by the Federal Public Works Administration, this was the third federal building constructed in Los Angeles.

The first Los Angeles federal building, completed 1892, housed the post office, U.S. District Court, and various federal agencies, but it soon proved inadequate.

The second Los Angeles federal building was used from 1910 to 1937 when it was razed for construction of the Spring Street Courthouse.

Gilbert Stanley Underwood was selected to design the building as consulting architect to the Office of the Supervising Architect of the Treasury Department. The actual plans were prepared by the Supervising Architect's Office. Underwood was acclaimed for his public architecture. His work includes lodges in National Parks, over two dozen post offices, a number of federal courthouses, and the magnificent United States Mint in San Francisco.

The original plan specified a fifteen-story building. Even before construction began in May 1937, the Treasury Department realized two more floors would be needed. Congress did not appropriate the additional funding until the initial fifteen-story building was finished in January 1939. The building's top two stories and penthouse were added between April 1939 and March 1940. At the time of its completion, it was the largest federal building in the western United States. The post office, located on the ground and first floors, moved to another site in 1965. The expanding U.S. District Court then took over the space.

The U.S. Court House has been the venue for a number of notable court cases, beginning in the 1940s with paternity cases against Clark Gable and Charlie Chaplin, and a breach of contract suit filed by Bette Davis against Warner Brothers. The House Un-American Activities Committee met in the building in 1947 to gather information on Hollywood personalities suspected of Communist involvement. In 1973 the federal government case against Daniel Ellsberg for leaking the "Pentagon Papers" was heard in the courthouse.

In 2016, the Central District moved to the New U.S. Court House on First between Broadway and Hill, leaving the building's courtrooms empty. In 2018, the Los Angeles County Superior Court began leasing courtrooms in the United States Courthouse from the federal government for some of its civil and complex civil departments. This meant the building would again be used as a courthouse, but would now host a state court instead of a federal court. Other portions of the U.S. Court House remain in use by certain federal agencies, including the U.S. Attorney's office, and Probation and Pretrial Services.

== Architecture ==
Located on a landscaped one-acre site bounded by Spring, Main, Temple and Aliso Streets in the Los Angeles Civic Center, the courthouse is a major example of Art Moderne architecture, characterized by its stepped rectangular massing and restrained use of exterior ornamentation. Dark gray granite with pink swirls is used for the steps, retaining walls, and walkway borders. Above a polished granite base, the seventeen-story steel-frame building is clad with a pale pink matte-glazed terra-cotta veneer. It is rectangular in plan, and steps back at the fourth and sixth stories. Above this rises a slab-like tower with a central two-story penthouse. The window openings are organized in vertical strips and set back from the facades. Sandblasted aluminum spandrels separate the paired double-hung windows. The roofs are flat and concealed by tall parapets.

The main entrance, which faces Spring Street, is three stories high and recessed behind fluted columns. Each of the five entrance doorways consists of a pair of bronze doors capped by a projecting curved hood bearing a stylized eagle. Above each doorway, an elaborate aluminum grille extends to the full height of the bay. These grilles are decorated with flowers and the seals of five U.S. Government departments: State, Treasury, War, Justice, and Post Office.

The opposite elevation, which faces Main Street, is similar, but has an additional lower story due to the slope of the site, and three entry bays rather than five. This elevation bears the seals of five additional federal departments: Navy, Interior, Agriculture, Commerce, and Labor.

The Spring Street and Main Street lobbies have retained most of their original finishes and furnishings. These include polychrome terrazzo floors, ornamental plaster ceilings, and ornate aluminum light fixtures. The Main Street lobby has an oval plan and has walls of Tennessee brown marble with golden Sienna travertine accents and engaged columns of black and gold marble from Montana. The floor contains an inlaid, eight-pointed starburst design, in red, yellow and green terrazzo with Cardiff green marble accents. Two statues stand at opposite ends of the lobby. "Law," depicting a young woman with a tablet, is by Archibald Garner. The other, titled The Young Lincoln, is by local art student James Lee Hansen; it won a Federal Works Agency competition The Spring Street lobby, which originally accommodated the post office, is larger, with a rectangular plan, and has a higher ceiling than the Main Street lobby. It is similar to the Spring Street lobby in its finishes. Four murals, originally installed in this lobby, were removed when the post office moved out. Two by Lucien Labaudt (Life on the Old Spanish and Mexican Ranchos, and Aeroydynamism) and one by Edward Biberman (Los Angeles Prehistoric Spanish Colonial) have been returned.

Eight original courtrooms for the U.S. District Court are located on the second floor. Designed according to four different plans, they are all three stories in height and similarly finished with walnut wainscoting and plaster ceilings bordered by various geometric designs such as stars, waves, and squares. The courtroom of the United States Court of Appeals on the sixteenth floor is also finished in walnut, with a plaster ceiling, but has less elaborate detailing than the second-floor courtrooms.

One of Los Angeles' most distinguished buildings, the United States Courthouse is directly on axis with, and complements, the massing of the twenty-eight-story Los Angeles City Hall (1926–1928), located across Temple Street to the south. It is also across the street from the fourteen-story Beaux Arts-style Hall of Justice (1925).

== Significant events ==
- 1889–1892: The first federal building is constructed in Los Angeles.
- 1906–1910: As the first building proves inadequate, a larger, six-story federal building is built on the site of the existing U.S. Courthouse.
- 1937–1940: The U.S. Post Office and Courthouse (later known as the U.S. Courthouse) is constructed.
- 1940s: The courthouse is the venue for several high-profile Hollywood cases, including paternity suits against Charles Chaplin and Clark Gable.
- 1947: As anti-Communist fervor hits Hollywood, the House Un-American Activities Committee convenes in the building.
- 1965: The post office relocates. The first floor and portions of the Spring Street lobby are altered.
- 1969-1970: The courthouse appears in the intro for the final season of Get Smart.
- 1993: Lucien Labaudt's mural Life on the Old Spanish and American Ranchos is returned to the Spring Street lobby.
- 2003: Edward Biberman's mural Los Angeles Prehistoric and Spanish Colonial is returned to the Spring Street lobby.

== Building facts ==
- Architect: Gilbert Stanley Underwood
- Construction Dates: 1937-1940
- Landmark Status: Determined eligible for listing in the National Register of Historic Places
- Location: 312 North Spring Street, in the Los Angeles Civic Center
- Architectural Style: Art Moderne
- Primary Materials: Polished granite and glazed terra-cotta
- Prominent Features: Stepped massing and ornamental aluminum grilles; sculptures in Main Street lobby; murals in Spring Street lobby

== See also ==
- National Register of Historic Places listings in Los Angeles
- List of Los Angeles federal buildings
- List of United States federal courthouses in California
- United States Courthouse (Los Angeles, California, 2016)
