= United States Post Office and Courthouse (Los Angeles, California, 1910) =

Second Los Angeles federal building

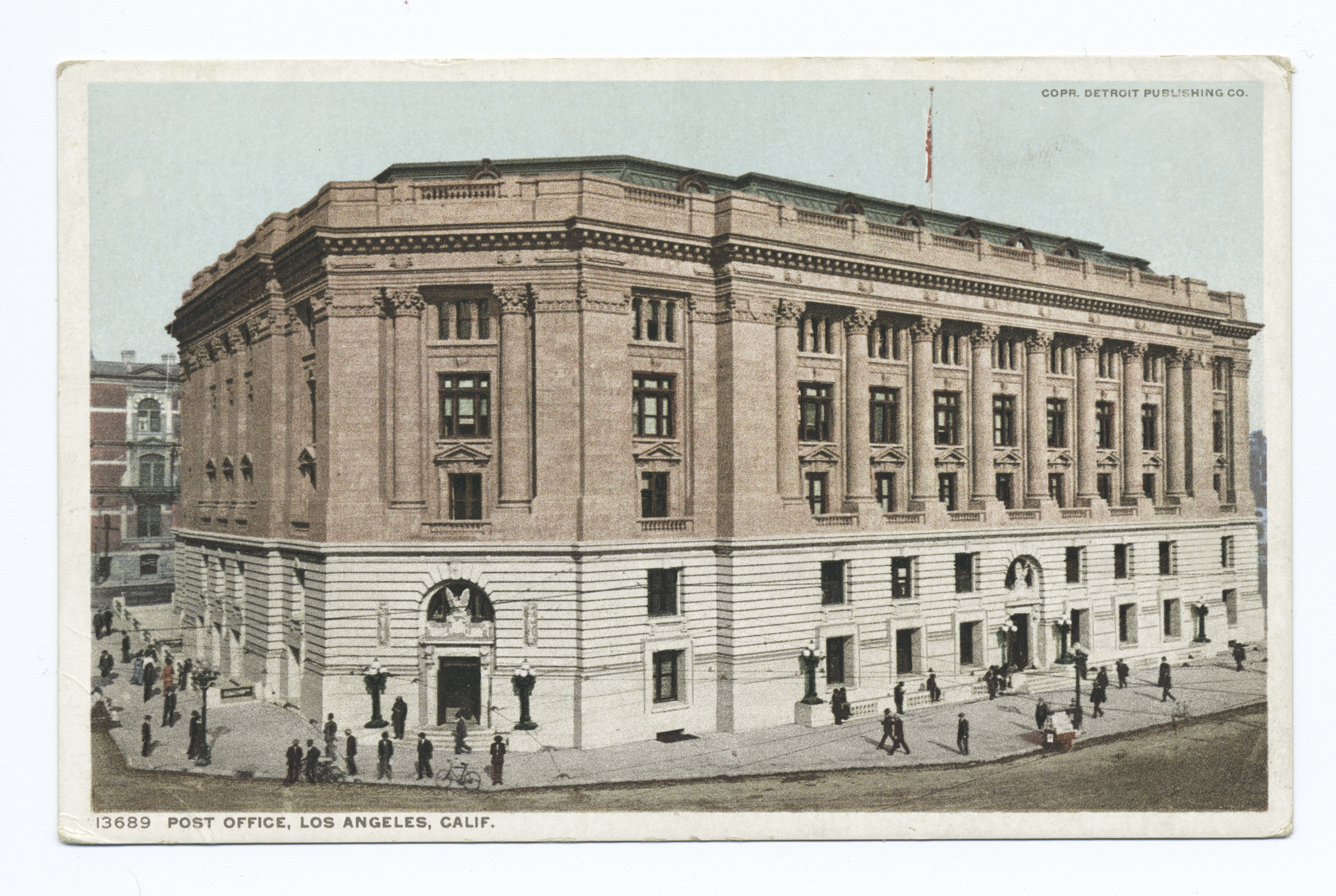
- Postcard c. 1910 (New York Public Library collections)
- Interactive map of the United States Post Office and Courthouse area
- Alternative names: Los Angeles Federal Building

General information
- Location: 312 N. Spring Street, Los Angeles, California, United States
- Coordinates: 34.0550°N 118.2414°W
- Opened: 1910
- Demolished: 1937

The second Los Angeles federal building in Los Angeles County, California, more formally the United States Post Office and Courthouse, was a government building in the United States was designed by James Knox Taylor ex officio and constructed between 1906 and 1910 on the block bounded by North Main, Spring, New High, and Temple Streets. The location was previously known as the Downey Block.

This building was preceded by a prior Los Angeles federal building opened in 1892. The second federal building was made of “red sandstone on a white granite base” and cost $500,000. Upon completion, the six-story building housed a post office, Southern District of California courtrooms, customs offices, and revenue offices. The "impressive" post office was a marble-lined hall within the building. The circuit court moved into the building in September 1910.

However, the population of Los Angeles grew rapidly in the early part of the 20th century, and a larger building was needed to serve the courts and federal agencies. The second federal building was razed in 1937 by the Works Progress Administration to clear the site for the Spring Street Courthouse.

The street address of this building may have been 201 N. Main Street.

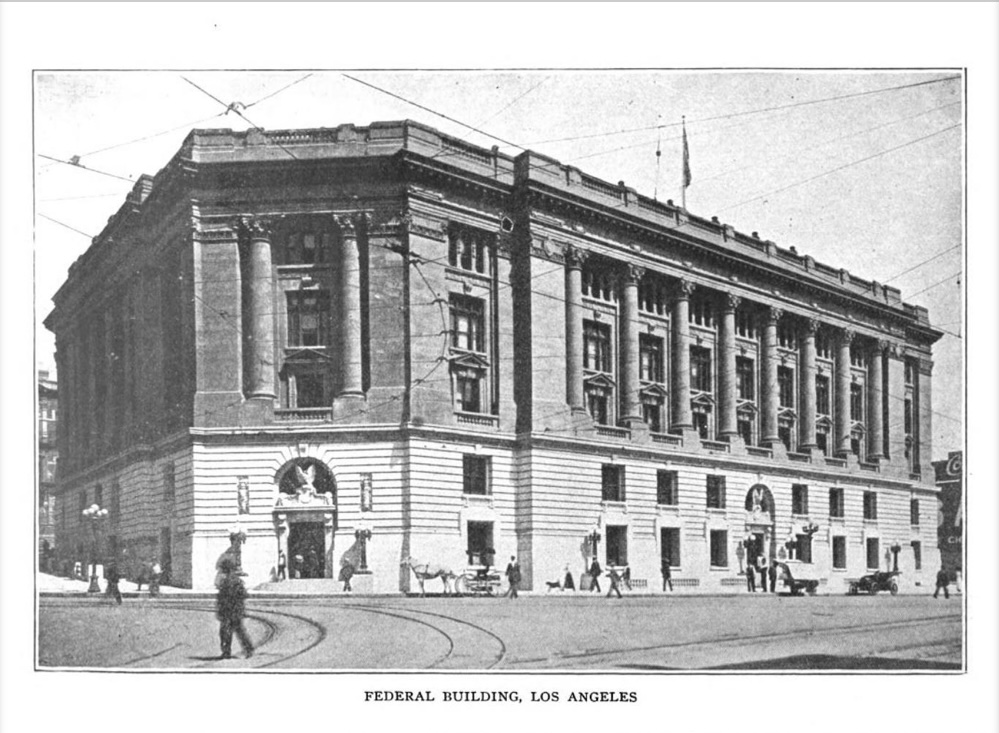
Second Los Angeles Federal Building (1910–1937)

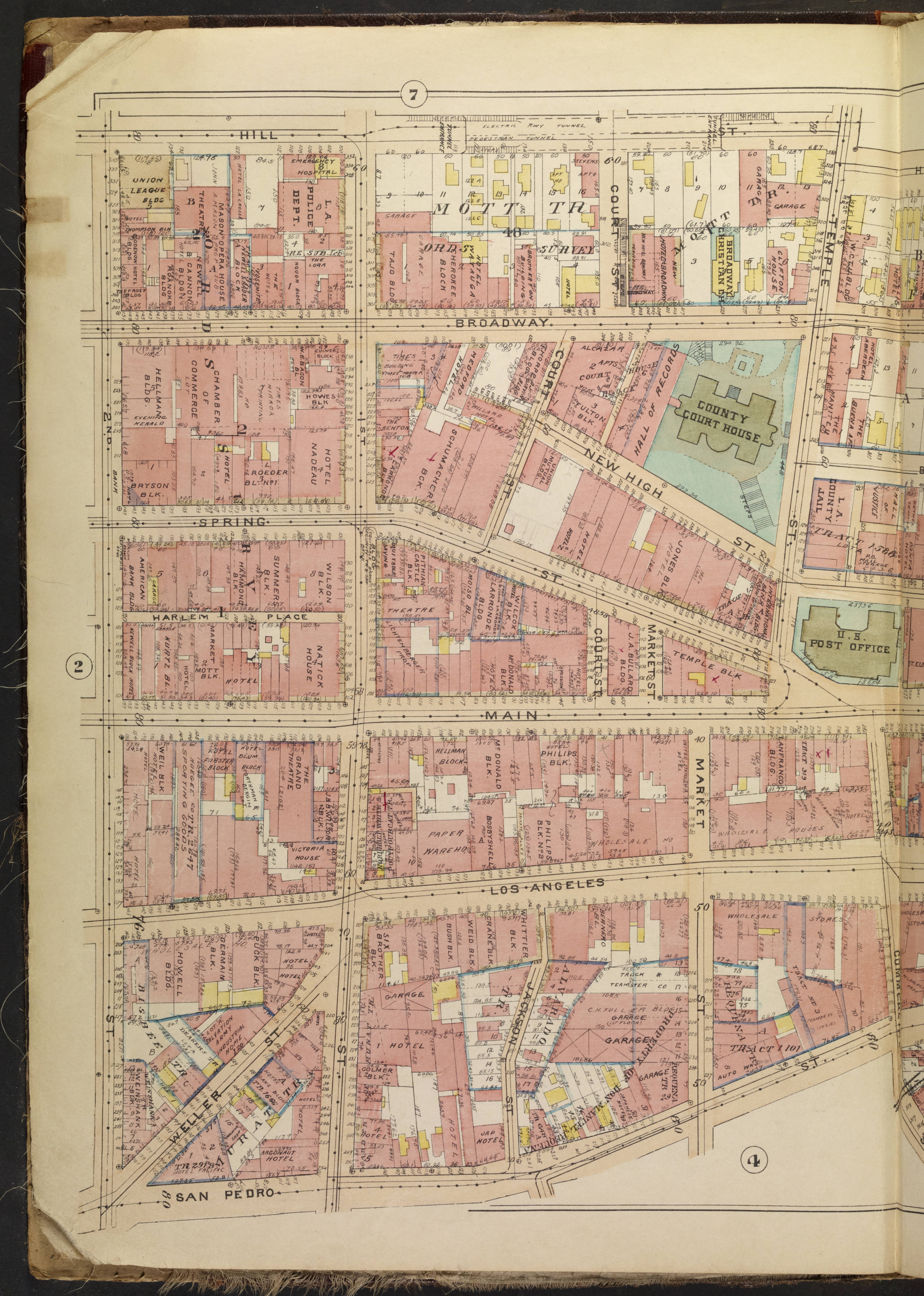
"Post office" in blue is the second federal building (real estate map, 1921)

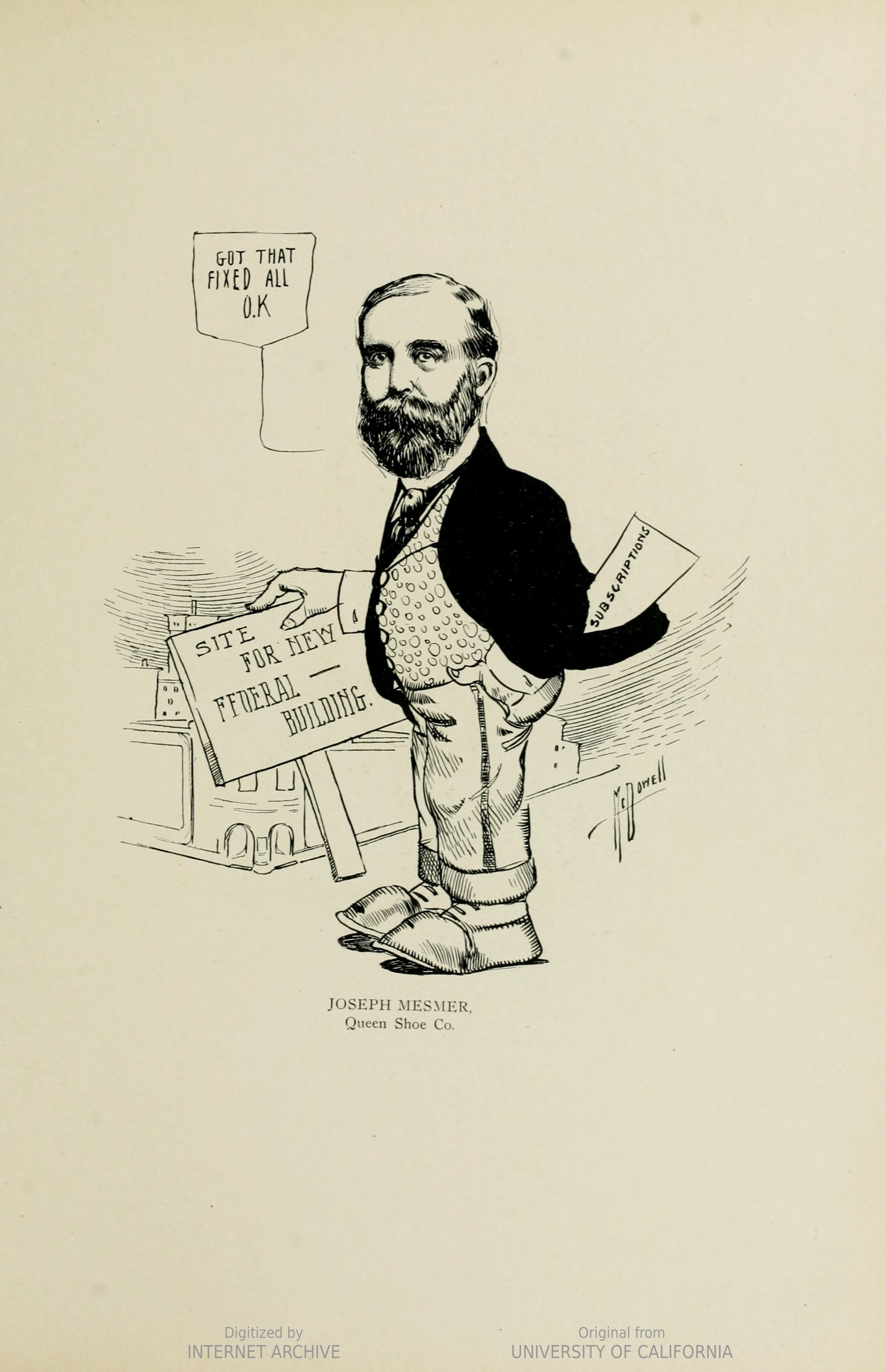
Caricature referencing Joseph Mesmer's fundraising for the second Los Angeles federal building

== See also ==
- List of Los Angeles federal buildings
- List of United States federal courthouses in California
- Tajo Building
