= Van Nuys Branch =

- Van Nuys Branch Library ("old"—1926 & "new"—1964)
- U.S. National Register of Historic Places
- Los Angeles Historic-Cultural Monument
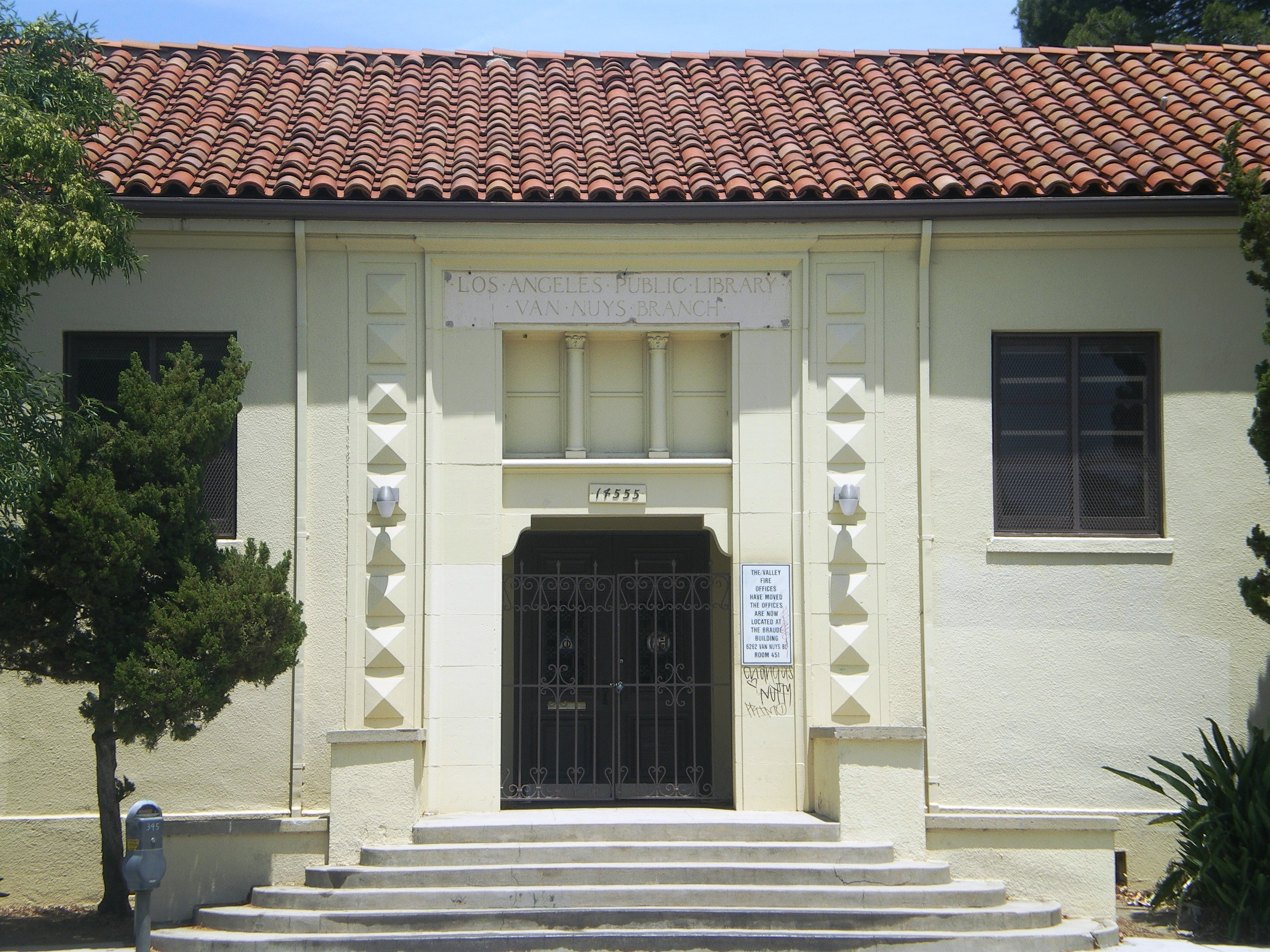
- "Old" Van Nuys Branch Library

- Location within the Los Angeles metropolitan area Location within California Location within the United States
- Location: 14555 Sylvan, Van Nuys, Los Angeles, California.
- Coordinates: 34°11′5″N 118°26′59″W
- Built: 1926; 1964
- Architect: Allison & Allison
- Architectural style: Mission-Spanish Colonial Revival (1926); Mid-century modern (1964)
- MPS: Los Angeles Branch Library System
- NRHP reference No.: 87001019
- LAHCM No.: 911

Significant dates
- Added to NRHP: May 19, 1987
- Designated LAHCM: February 13, 2008

Van Nuys Branch covers two branch library buildings of the Los Angeles Public Library, both located in Van Nuys, central San Fernando Valley, Los Angeles, California.

== "Old" branch ==
The original or "Old" Van Nuys Branch library was built in 1926 based on a Spanish Colonial Revival style design by architects Allen & Allen. In 37 years of operation, the circulation grew from 27,000 to more than 350,000 volumes annually. The old branch was closed in 1964, and replaced with a new branch in the Van Nuys Civic Center on the other side of Van Nuys Boulevard.

National Register of Historic Places

In 1987, the "Old" Van Nuys Branch and several other branch libraries in Los Angeles were added to the National Register of Historic Places as part of a thematic group submission.

== "New" branch ==
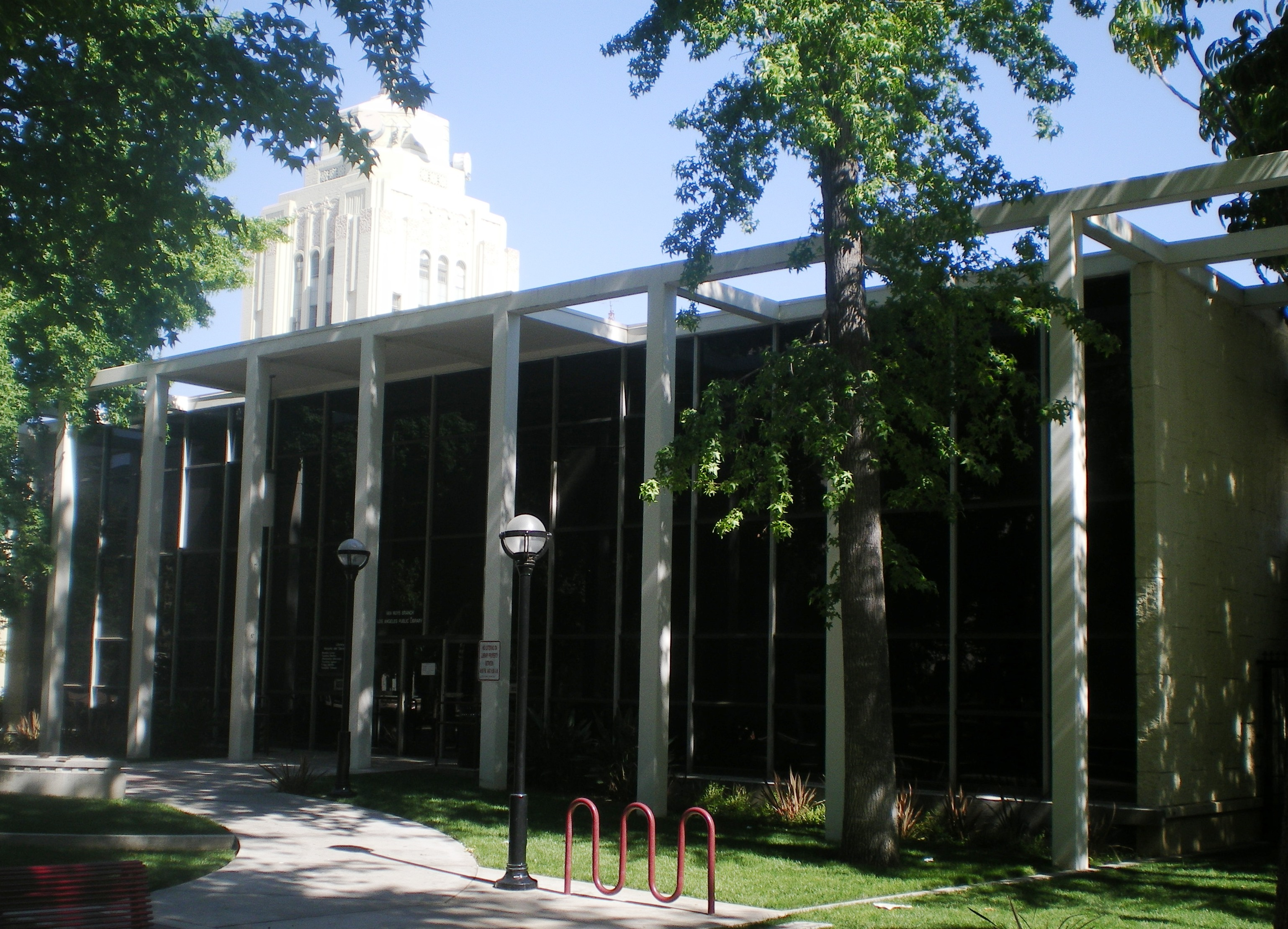
1964 Mid-century modern "New" Van Nuys Branch library

The "New" Van Nuys Branch library opened in 1964 in the then-new Van Nuys Civic Center. The Mid-century modern style one-story masonry building extends out into the landscape with a modernist colonnade, and is shaded by groves of trees.

The building was also headquarters for the Los Angeles Public Library's bookmobile service. It was temporarily closed and surrounded by a chain-link fence in 2005, and in 2007 the city announced plans to auction off the building. Instead it was renovated to reopen as the branch library again.

The restored and updated "New" Van Nuys branch library is again the Los Angeles Public Library branch for Van Nuys, in the expanded Van Nuys Government Center complex of public buildings that replaced the former Van Nuys Civic Center.

In January 2019, the "New" Van Nuys branch library closed again for renovations. It was scheduled to reopen in summer 2020, but the renovations were delayed due to COVID-19. The library finally reopened in October 2021.

== See also ==
- List of Los Angeles Historic-Cultural Monuments in the San Fernando Valley
- Los Angeles Public Library — listing of branches.
- List of Registered Historic Places in Los Angeles
