= Van Nuys City Hall =

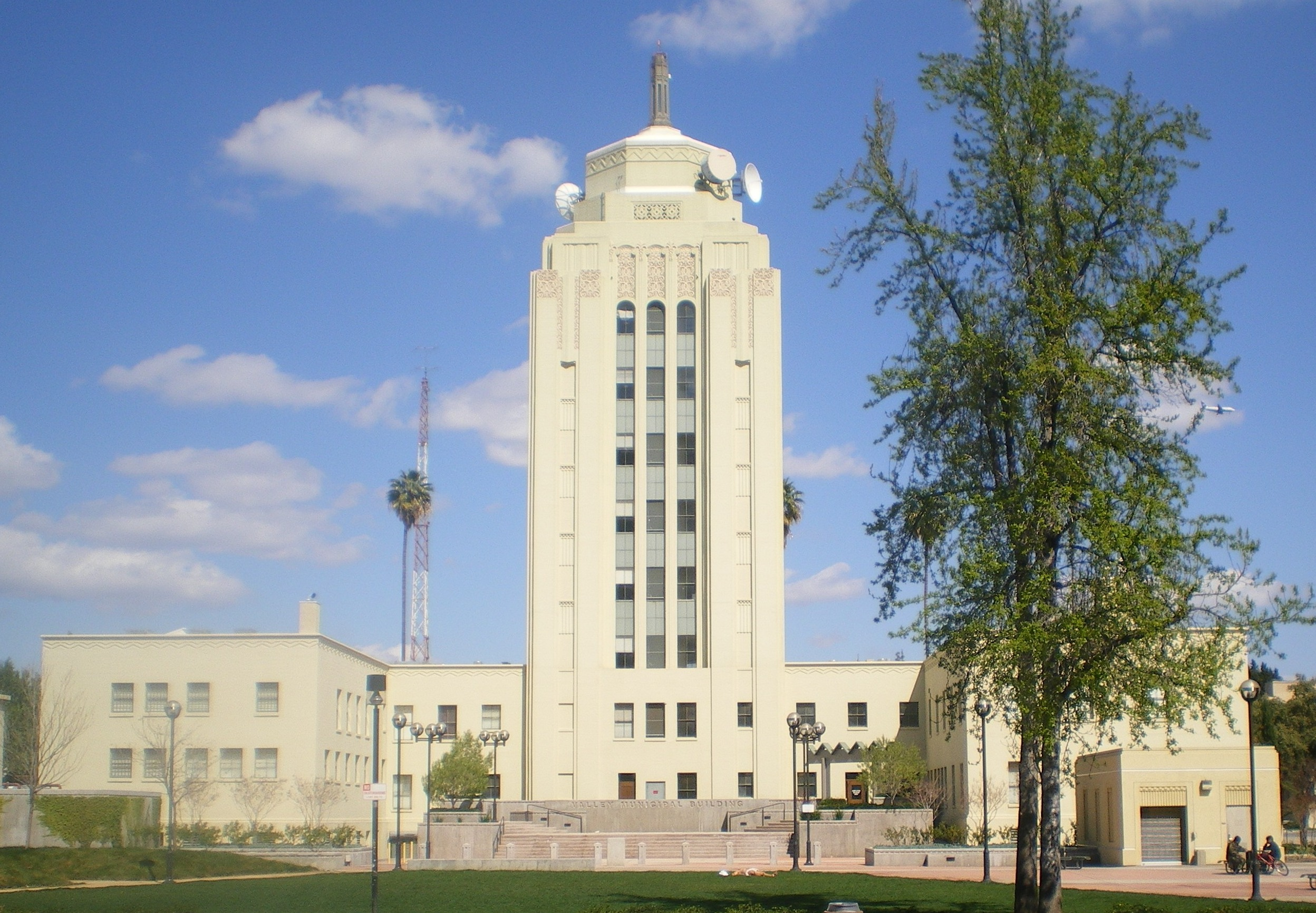
- Interactive map of the Van Nuys City Hall area
- Former names: Valley Municipal Building

General information
- Architectural style: Art Deco
- Location: Van Nuys Government Center, 14410 Sylvan Street, Van Nuys, Los Angeles, United States
- Construction started: June 1932
- Inaugurated: 1933
- Cost: $275,000

Technical details
- Floor count: 8

Design and construction
- Architect: Peter Karl Schabarum
- Main contractor: Herbert M. Baruch Corporation

Van Nuys City Hall, built in 1932 originally as the Valley Municipal Building, serves various municipal services for the San Fernando Valley residents of the City of Los Angeles such as meeting chambers and public service offices and was dedicated as a Historic-Cultural Monument in 1968. Its 8 stories contain over 49,000 square feet. It is located within the larger Van Nuys Government Center on Van Nuys Boulevard, at its intersection with Sylvan Street.

== History ==
The need for the Van Nuys City Hall is documented from 1916 when the City of Los Angeles rented a twenty-foot store building to house the Department of Water and the City Engineer's Office. Within eight months the need for more space became evident, which paralleled the expansion of the San Fernando Valley itself. Postcards mailed to the City Clerk of Los Angeles decided the final location of where the Van Nuys City Hall would be built in 1929. In order to prepare for the increased traffic outside of Van Nuys City Hall, Sylvan Street was widened in 1932 to extend the street by 3 feet while maintaining a minimum of 12 feet on the sidewalk for pedestrians.

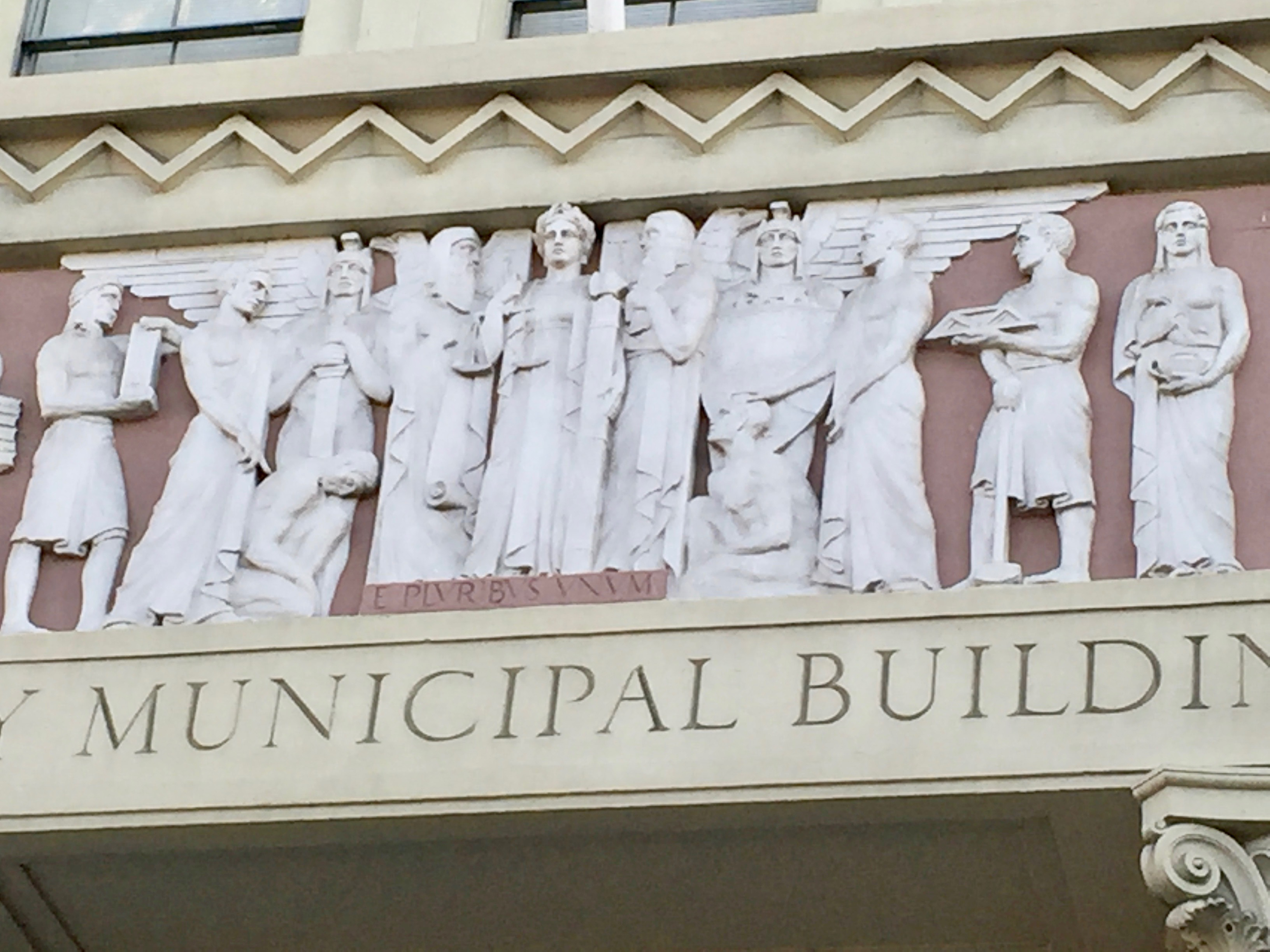
Frieze above the Valley Municipal Building entryway.

The building was designed by architect Peter K. Schabarum; it cost roughly $275,000 and was initially contracted with the Herbert M. Baruch Corporation, with foundation work beginning in June 1932. During the opening ceremony in 1933, 10,000 people attended—including prominent Van Nuys social figures, city officials, and some movie stars that resided in the San Fernando Valley at the time. Inspiration for the building came from art-deco design principles such as the usage of frieze inside and outside, bas relief detail, Greek style columns, and rosette grills. Originally, the building served a wider variety of purposes upon creation such as maintaining a police department, hospital, municipal court, and jail but has pivoted to maintain solely government related services with population growth in the decades following its creation The integrity of the original design principles has been maintained since its creation, offering the building as a recognizable landmark of the San Fernando Valley.

Officials such as 22nd Congressional District Representative James C. Corman came to view the Van Nuys City Hall as an important link between the politics of Washington, D.C. and the San Fernando Valley's bustling population. Field offices for elected officials became established following the decades of the Van Nuys City Hall's creation, and would come to further characterize the link of political representation present in the local City Hall itself. Local politicians pushed to stop renting out nearby offices and to use the vacated floors of the Van Nuys City Hall which was understood to save taxpayer money at the time

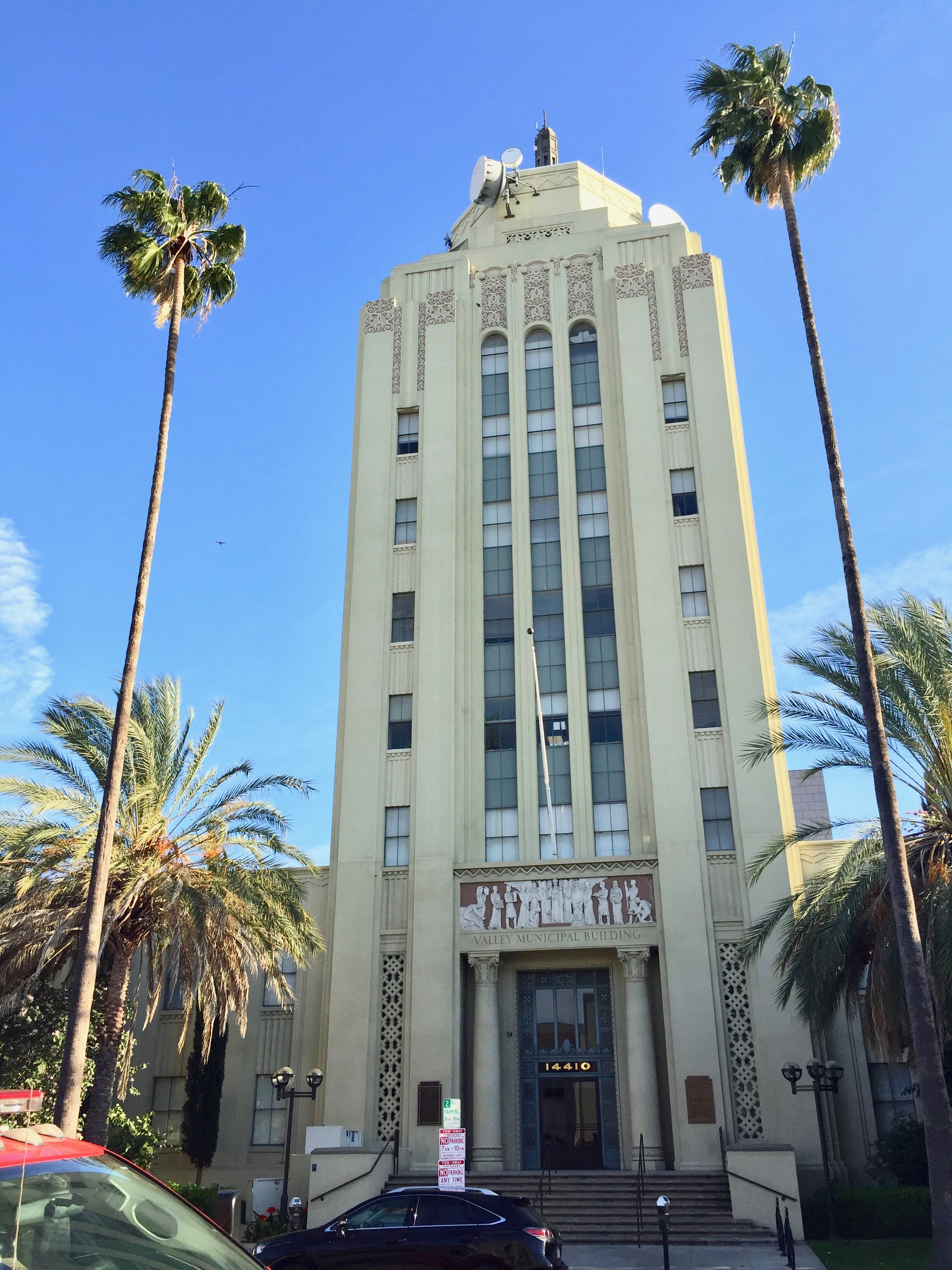
View of the Valley Municipal Building from across the street.

In 1986, the current state of the Van Nuys City Hall's condition was questioned and the City of Los Angeles called in special historical consultants to survey the 54-year-old building. The Van Nuys City Hall had slowly become more culturally important to the area, and a testament to Art Deco era craftsmanship that was becoming visually worn despite remaining a popular tourist destination.

== Culture ==
The Van Nuys Arts Festival takes place every year directly outside of the Van Nuys City Hall, and serves as an important cultural and artistic exchange for local residents and San Fernando Valley residents. Each year the program is supported by the Los Angeles Department of Cultural Affairs and is an important preservation and cultivation tool of the San Fernando Valley's history and culture where the Hall itself creates an open public gathering space.

Existence of the Van Nuys City Hall has been understood by locals to show the unique significance and importance of the San Fernando Valley, as separate to that of Los Angeles County as a whole. The building has been used as a rallying point for locals during years when the San Fernando Valley contemplated secession from the city of Los Angeles such as in 2002

== Changes caused by earthquakes ==
In 1971 the building suffered some damage during the 1971 Sylmar earthquake, which would spark some discussion on allocating funds to the aging building's safety and preparation for future earthquake preparations. During the late 1980s, the building was expected to receive some funding to prepare for future earthquakes, but as of 1986, work done to the Van Nuys City Hall was not to be completed until improvements were made to the Los Angeles City Hall first. While it was noted that improvements were needed to maintain safety and historical preservation, private and corporate donations were desired to make the improvements in a timely manner, but this stalling would only produce no major updates.

Due to the building's proximity to the 1994 Northridge Earthquake, roughly $15 million in repairs and updates was seen as necessary in restoring the Valley building. While some practical work was completed immediately following the earthquake such as preventing additional tiles falling from services, retrofitting the building against future earthquakes would only be completed years later but would prepare the building for earthquakes as high as an 8.0 Richter scale. For about 10 years following the 1994 earthquake, city officials and local meetings were shifted into temporary locations while negotiations for building improvements lie mostly dormant or stalled. After the earthquake, the Los Angeles City Council did not meet in the building until November 17, 2005 after major improvements were finished. For the 2005 reopening, in addition to damage repair, the improvements to the City Hall included underground parking for roughly 300 spaces, updated plumbing and electrical systems, and two additional large meeting rooms.

== See also ==
- List of Los Angeles Historic-Cultural Monuments in the San Fernando Valley
- Van Nuys Government Center
