= Los Angeles County Law Library =

Public library

- U.S. National Register of Historic Places
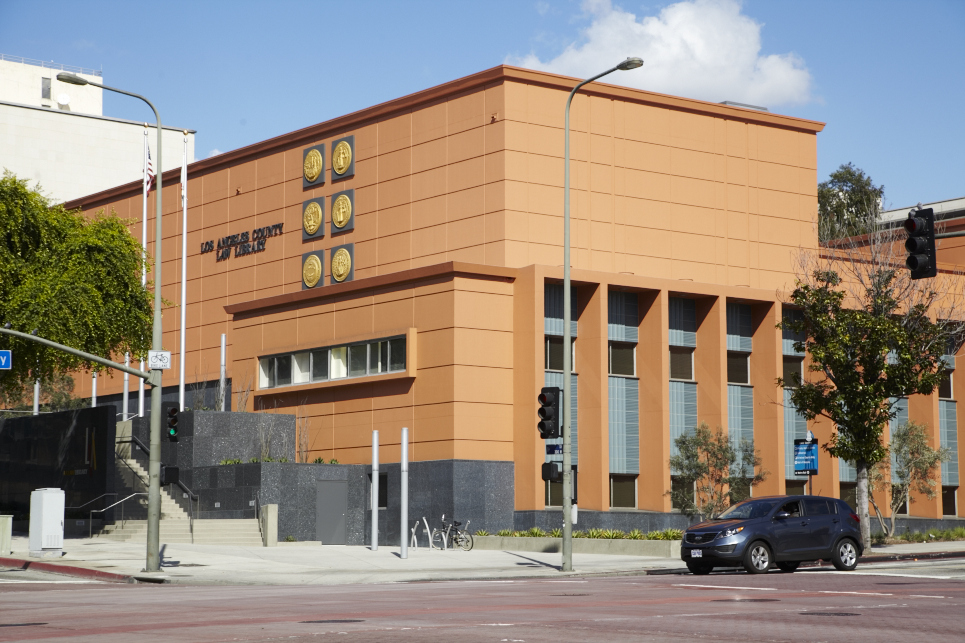
- South side extrance and exterior on Broadway

- Location within the Los Angeles metropolitan area Location within California Location within the United States
- Location: 301 W. 1st St. Los Angeles, California
- Coordinates: 34°03′14.76″N 118°14′45.6″W
- Area: 1-acre (0.40 ha)
- Built: 1953
- Built by: James J. Barnes Construction Co. of San Francisco
- Architects: Austin, Field, & Fry
- Architectural style: Late Moderne
- NRHP reference No.: 100012283..
- Added to NRHP: September 23, 2025

Los Angeles County Law Library, also known as LA Law Library (LALL), is a public law library with its main branch at the Mildred L. Lillie Building located in the Civic Center of Downtown Los Angeles. It is not associated with the Los Angeles County Public Library (LAPL) system and is separately categorized as an independent public agency. In addition to the main location in Downtown Los Angeles, LALL also has branch locations and partnerships in Compton, Lancaster, Long Beach, Pasadena, Santa Monica, and Van Nuys

LALL is the second largest public law library in the United States and the largest county law library in California. It is the largest library member of the Council of California County Law Libraries (CCCLL). CCCLL actively advocates for law library funding through state legislative efforts.

The Main Branch of LALL was completed in 1953 with a northern extension added in 1971. It was renamed in honor of Justice Mildred L. Lillie in 2003, and was listed on the National Register of Historic Places (NRHP) on September 23, 2025.

== History ==
In 1878, a group of Los Angeles lawyers formed the Los Angeles Bar Association (LABA) with the intention of establishing a private law library. They used bar association dues to fund the purchases of law books and incorporated a private institution, the Law Library of Los Angeles. Due to the Law Library of Los Angeles's and other similar law libraries' financial struggles, state legislators passed The Act to Establish Law Libraries on March 31, 1891 which went into effect on April 25, 1891. This Act directed $1 from the first filing fee for civil actions, proceedings, or appeals in county superior courts to be set aside for the purchase of law books and periodicals, the establishment and maintenance of a law library in each county of the state, and further provided that the funds be managed by a Board of Trustees.

After meeting on April 28, 1891, LA Law Library's Board of Trustees agreed to purchase the Law Library of Los Angeles' private collection. On June 11, 1891, a contract was executed for 4,649 volumes, valued at around $10,000, purchased for $11,411.20, among other payment terms, becoming LALL's foundational collection. The Los Angeles County Law Library opened later that year in the Red Sandstone Court House on Temple Street, on August 10, 1891.

In 1905, the library was located in the Merchants Trust Building at 207 S. Broadway. In 1909, the library moved to the International Savings Bank Building on Temple Street, and in 1912, to the seventh floor of the Hall of Records. In 1926, branch libraries were established in the Hall of Justice and municipal court buildings. In 1932, a fourth-floor addition was added in the Hall of Records. Storeroom facilities were also used at 808 N. Spring Street and in the civic center's basement.

In the early 1950s, after much debate, negotiation, and dealmaking, the parcel the LALL was on and an adjacent, county-owned, parcel of land was exchanged for a state-held parcel on First and Broadway, where the library’s main location was built and currently remains. With careful planning, it took 19 days in 1953 to pack and move 250,000 volumes from 4 locations and cost $12,174.09.

An 83,000 square feet (7,700 m^{2}) northern extension was constructed in the 70's which doubled the size of the library to 166,300 square feet (15,450 m^{2}). This expansion kept the Late Moderne style of the 1953 building and was designed by the same architect firm.

On November 6, 2003, the building was renamed in honor of Justice Mildred L. Lillie.

In 2012, the building was repaired and renovated after water damage. External renovations include waterproofing in the form of rubberized paint, the addition of a patio and walkway, replacing landscaping to native flora, and installation of a drainage system. Internal renovations included expanding to 22 public computer terminals, implementing public Wi-Fi, and adding a Members Study.

== Mission ==
LA Law Library's mission has been to provide access to legal information and legal materials to legal professionals, the judiciary, members of the California State Bar, and all county residents. Today, LALL's mission is to support people's needs, curate and cultivate a superior collection of legal resources, act as a gateway to legal information and as a navigator facilitating access to the legal system.

== Governance and funding ==
In accordance with California Business & Professions Code §6301, LA Law Library is governed by a seven-member Board of Trustees consisting of five Superior Court judges appointed by the Presiding Judge of the Superior Court of Los Angeles County, a chair appointed by the County Board of Supervisors or a resident of the County appointed in the chair’s stead, and a seventh trustee appointed by the County Board of Supervisors.

Since its inception in 1891, LA Law Library, like other county law libraries, has received a large majority of its funding not from taxpayer dollars but rather through court filing fees. In accordance to California Business & Professions Code §§6320 - 6326, the Administrative Office of the Courts distribute superior court filing fees to law libraries from each first paper filing fee, each first paper or petition filing fee in probate, each filing fee for a small claim or limited civil case appeal, and each vehicle forfeiture petition fee. The dollar amount per filing fee allotted to each county's law library vary based on county. Aside from filing fees, LA Law Library generates the remainder of its revenue from limited fee-based services and fines, and has also received occasional supplemental state funding.

== Collections ==
LA Law Library houses and archives over 1 million volumes of legal material in its collection in physical format, and offers comprehensive legal database access. The collection consists of primary and secondary materials that cover federal, state and U.S. territories, and global law. The collection includes legal material from virtually every jurisdiction in the world that publishes law.

=== Practice materials ===
LA Law Library is a practice library, and its collection has a focus on secondary practice materials for attorneys and the general public. Practice materials include manuals, textbooks, dictionaries, guides, self-help books, forms, and templates to aid in preparing legal documents and representing parties (including oneself) in legal proceedings.

=== Briefs ===
LA Law Library maintains a large collection of briefs filed in the California Supreme Court and Courts of Appeal. The collection includes printed briefs from 1849 and digitized briefs starting from the 1990's. It is one of four designated depository libraries in California to receive state appellate court briefs.

=== Databases ===
LA Law Library maintains free public access to a host of legal database subscriptions. Legal databases such as Westlaw, LexisNexis, and HeinOnline can be used for case law research and other primary law research, accessing court material, and secondary material from publishers.

=== Government documents ===
LA Law Library is a Federal Depository Library. It obtains and maintains federal government documents including but not limited to:

- U.S. Code (1925 - present)
- U.S. Statutes (1789 - present)
- U.S. Serial Set (1964 - present),
- Congressional Hearings (1906 - present)
- Code of Federal Regulations (1938 - present).

LALL is also a state depository law library. In accordance to California Government Code §14909, it obtains and maintains state government documents including but not limited to:

- Legislative bills, journals, and reports (1884 - present)
- California Administrative Code and Register (1942 - present)
- California Statutes (1861 - present)
- One of copy of each printed publication from the Office of State Printing (1877 - 1972)

=== Global law ===
LA Law Library houses and archives a large collection of foreign and international legal material including primary and secondary legal material. More than one-third of the library's total holdings are within the global law collection (300,000+ volumes). Global law materials include:

- International trade, business and tax law
- Foreign statutory and case law
- Treaties and conventions
- Cross-border family law
- Comparisons of legal systems and procedures

=== Rare books ===
LA Law Library's collection of rare books is centered around legal material with their earliest material being a collection of statutes and ordinances enacted under Henry VIII from 1513.

Some materials include:

- The establishment of the Continental Congress
- Records of colonies, states, and territories,
- Treaties
- Records of before and after statehood with an emphasis on California
- History and development of the legal community in California

== Services ==
LA Law Library is both a public lending and reference library, a large portion of the collection is available for lending with a library card as well as items only available to read at the library. Other services include:

- LALawLibrary.org: Official website. Content includes self-help classes, class and event registration, catalogue, pleading paper, and remote resources of legal material.
- Lawyers in the Library: Free 15-minute consultation with a volunteer attorney.
- Minimum Continuing Legal Education (MCLE): Available via CD and online classes for members of the California State Bar.
- Court Interpreter Minimum Continuing Education (CIMCE): Available via online classes for certified court and registered interpreters.
- Ask Now Law Librarian: A free service for submitting questions to California law librarians via chat.
- Classes and Workshops: Free classes on legal topics available in-person, live webinars, or recorded for on-demand viewing and in-person workshops.
- Community Connections: Free consultation with a resource specialist with access to benefits, services, and support.

== Architecture ==
With a schedule to start construction on July 15, 1952, the 3-story main building has 6 levels with 7.5 feet (230 cm) shelves spanning from floor to ceiling with only the ground level open to the public. The building was designed by an architect firm partnered by John C. Austin, Robert Field Jr., and Charles Fry and constructed by James J. Barnes Construction Co. of San Francisco, as part of the Civic Center Master Plan. The contract cost $1,1129,900 and the building was completed and opened on December 14, 1953, with 20 miles (32 km) of shelving to hold a capacity of 517,425 volumes. The exterior walls of the building are architectural concrete with joints that create a rectangular grid pattern with a streel-trussed roof over wide spans and concrete beam and joist construction over shorter spans. The entrance wall is decorated with panels in relief, containing seals of the state of California and courts Los Angeles lawyers practice in: the U.S. Supreme Court, the U.S. Court of Appeals for the Ninth Circuit, the U.S. District Court for the Southern District of California, the Supreme Court of California, the California District Court of Appeal, the Superior Court of Los Angeles County and the Municipal Court of Los Angeles. The reading room featured slimline fluorescent light fixtures fixed 19 feet (5.8 m) above the floor, acoustic tile insulation, steel and metal lath and plaster interior walls, smoking alcoves along the north wall, conference rooms, 8 typing rooms, coin-operated lockers, and a 10-unit telephone booth room. The building was also furnished with a foreign and rare book reading room, microfiche reading machines, staff elevators, and a public stenographer's room. All areas were air conditioned boasting a filtering system for the smog. A parking structure was also built on Broadway and Hill St. at this time.

In 1961, LALL received an award from Los Angeles Beautiful for planting six Indian laurel trees in the sidewalk. The award was received by Superior Judge Frank G. Swain.

In 1965, a $1.8 million northern addition was planned and budgeted, due to the rate of growth of the library. Construction was started in the fall of 1968 and completed in 1971 and added 83,000 square feet (7,700 m^{2}) of climate-controlled space and 95,000 feet (29 km) of shelving to the library. This addition changed LALL from a rectangular structure to a square structure and added a second reference desk, space for photocopying, a teletype room for computers, and staff office spaces. This addition removed the northern windows and smoking alcove but nearly doubled the size of the stacks and reading room, updating the capacity to hold more than 1 million volumes.

The building and the 1970s addition is on the National Register of Historic Places.

In 2007, water damage was sustained due to wall and roof leaks. In 2012, the Building Envelope Repair & Exterior Restoration Project was completed and cost around $5.8 million dollars. Repair was made to the roofing and walls, a 30 feet (9.1 m) deep trench was dug around the exterior of the library, and a rubberized paint coated the concrete exterior walls for waterproofing. The terracotta color of the paint was chosen as an homage to the Red Sandstone Court House, where the library was first located in 1891. The exterior of the library was also renovated to include a public usable outdoor space including a patio and a large walkway. Previous flora were replaced with drought resistant ones. In addition to the exterior renovation, the reading room tables were fitted with outlets, and public computer terminals were expanded from 12 to 22 spaces. Some notable interior renovations include new reference and circulation desks, conference rooms, public Wi-Fi, and a Members Study.

== See also ==
- Public Law Libraries in the United States
- Law Library
- American Association of Law Libraries
- Los Angeles County Superior Court
- Tajo Building, same location (1898–1940)
