= List of United States federal courthouses in California =

Following is a list of current and former courthouses of the United States federal court system located in California. Each entry indicates the name of the building along with an image, if available, its location and the jurisdiction it covers, the dates during which it was used for each such jurisdiction, and, if applicable the person for whom it was named, and the date of renaming. Dates of use will not necessarily correspond with the dates of construction or demolition of a building, as pre-existing structures may be adapted for court use, and former court buildings may later be put to other uses. Also, the official name of the building may be changed at some point after its use as a federal court building has been initiated.

== Courthouses ==
Courthouse	City	Image	Street address	Jurisdiction	First used	Last used	Notes
U.S. Courthouse	Bakersfield		510 19th Street	E.D. Cal.	2012	present	
U.S. Courthouse	El Centro		2003 West Adams Avenue	S.D. Cal.	?	present	
U.S. Post Office & Courthouse^{†}	Eureka		514 H Street	N.D. Cal.	1912	c. 2014	Still in use as a post office.
U.S. Post Office & Court House	Fresno		Van Ness Avenue and Tulare Street	S.D. Cal.	1908	1940	Razed in 1940.
U.S. Post Office & Court House	Fresno		2309 Tulare Street	S.D. Cal.	1940	1966	Still in use as a post office and by the Fresno Unified School District.
Robert E. Coyle U.S. Courthouse	Fresno		2500 Tulare Street	E.D. Cal.	2005	present	Named after District Court Judge Robert Everett Coyle.
U.S. Post Office & Courthouse	Los Angeles		Main and Winston Streets	S.D. Cal.	1892	1901	Court was at Tajo Building at Broadway & 1st from 1901 to 1910
U.S. Post Office & Courthouse	Los Angeles		312 North Spring Street	S.D. Cal.	1910	1937	Razed, new courthouse built on same site
U.S. Courthouse^{†}	Los Angeles		312 North Spring Street	S.D. Cal. C.D. Cal.	1940	present	
Edward R. Roybal Federal Building & U.S. Courthouse	Los Angeles		255 East Temple Street	S.D. Cal. C.D. Cal.	1992	present	Named after U.S. Rep. Edward R. Roybal.
U.S. Courthouse	Los Angeles		350 West 1st Street	C.D. Cal.	2016	present	
U.S. Courthouse	McKinleyville		3140 Boeing Avenue	N.D. Cal.	c. 2014	present	
Ronald V. Dellums Federal Building	Oakland		1301 Clay Street	N.D. Cal.	1994	present	Named after U.S. Rep. and Oakland Mayor Ron Dellums.
Richard H. Chambers U.S. Court of Appeals^{†}	Pasadena		125 South Grand Avenue	9th Cir.	1985	present	Formerly the Vista del Arroyo Hotel. Named after Court of Appeals Judge Richard H. Chambers in 1992.
U.S. District Court	Redding		2986 Bechelli Lane	E.D. Cal.	?	present	
George E. Brown, Jr. Federal Building and U.S. Courthouse (U.S. District Court and U.S. Bankruptcy Court)	Riverside		3420–3470 12th Street	C.D. Cal.	?	present	
U.S. Post Office and Courthouse	Sacramento		7th and K Streets	N.D. Cal.	1919	1933	Demolished in 1966.
U.S. Post Office and Courthouse^{†}	Sacramento		801 I Street	N.D. Cal. E.D. Cal.	1933	?	Still used by federal offices.
Robert T. Matsui U.S. Courthouse	Sacramento		501 I Street	E.D. Cal.	1999	present	Named after U.S. Rep. Robert T. Matsui.
Jacob Weinberger U.S. Courthouse^{†}	San Diego		325 West F Street	S.D. Cal.	1913	present	Named after U.S. District Court Judge Jacob Weinberger in 1986.
Edward J. Schwartz Courthouse	San Diego		221 West Broadway	S.D. Cal.	1975	present	Named after District Court Judge Edward Joseph Schwartz.
James M. Carter and Judith N. Keep U.S. Courthouse	San Diego		333 West Broadway	S.D. Cal.	2013	present	Named after District Court Judges James M. Carter and Judith N. Keep.
U.S. Courthouse	San Francisco			D. Cal. N.D. Cal.	1879	1905	Appraiser's Building on Sansome Street. Razed in 1940.
James R. Browning U.S. Courthouse	San Francisco		95 7th Street	N.D. Cal. 9th Cir.	1905	present	Named after Court of Appeals Judge James R. Browning in 2004.
Phillip Burton Federal Building and U.S. Courthouse	San Francisco		450 Golden Gate Avenue	N.D. Cal.	1959	present	Named after U.S. Rep. Phillip Burton in 1983.
Robert F. Peckham Federal Building	San Jose		280 South 1st Street	N.D. Cal.	1980s	present	Named after District Court Judge Robert Francis Peckham.
Ronald Reagan Federal Building and Courthouse	Santa Ana		411 West Fourth Street	C.D. Cal.	1999	present	Named after President Ronald Reagan in 1992.
U.S. Bankruptcy Court	Santa Barbara		1415 State Street	C.D. Cal.	?	present	
U.S. Bankruptcy Court	Santa Rosa		99 South E Street	N.D. Cal.	?	present	
U.S. Bankruptcy Court	Woodland Hills		21041 Burbank Boulevard	C.D. Cal.	?	present	
U.S. District Court	Yosemite		9004 Castle Cliff Court	E.D. Cal.	1987	present	

== Key ==
^{†}	Listed on the National Register of Historic Places (NRHP)
^{††}	NRHP-listed and also designated as a National Historic Landmark
