= Lewis William Klinker =

- Born: August 12, 1867; Mahaska County, Iowa
- Died: July 5, 1946 (aged 78)
- Education: Drake University
- Spouse: Lydia Jane Raver

Lewis William (L.W.) Klinker (August 12, 1867 – July 5, 1946) was a prominent businessman, author, lecturer and public figure in Los Angeles, California, in the early part of the 1900s. He became known in the fields of ministry, hydraulic gold mining and real estate during the period of the rapid growth of the city of Los Angeles where he made his home for 41 years.

== Life ==
Klinker, a native of Mahaska County, Iowa, and graduate of Drake University in Des Moines, Iowa, was an ordained minister in the Christian Church. He held pastorates in three states in his native Iowa, Kansas and California. While living in Southern California, Klinker organized and helped establish three Christian Churches (Disciples of Christ).

The Rev. L.W. Klinker was an active orator on the Chautauqua Circuit of lectures around the United States. In 1913 he was promoted by the Jones Chautagua System of Perry, Iowa for their Pioneer Circuit as the Silver Tongued Orator, a prominent speaker from the Pacific Coast. Among the topics were The Sunny Side of Life, The Golden West and The Art of Getting There.

Upon arrival in California, Klinker joined a family business in the mining industry. In 1908 L.W. Klinker and his brother E.C. Klinker were owners of the Rawhide King Hill Mine in the now-defunct and legendary and historic ghost town of Rawhide, Nevada. L.W. served as President. His 1908 scrapbook and photographic record of this substantial gold mining operation resides in the Special Collections of the Princeton University Firestone Library in Princeton, New Jersey.

The Los Angeles Mining Review reports that in 1912 L.W. Klinker of Grizzly Ridge Mining Companies was traveling to Nevada City to oversee work. The same year The Mining and Scientific Press tells of the Klinker Bros. of Los Angeles operating the Oustomah Mine in Nevada County, with L.W. as manager. Klinker was the author of a novel. a fictional story centered around hydraulic gold mining, titled Winning A Fortune. The book was published in 1915 by. W.B. Conkey Co. and illustrated by his daughter, notable artist Orpha Klinker.

Klinker became a Los Angeles businessman in real estate development. He was president of his company, Security Title Company, and owner of the Klinker Building in downtown Los Angeles at First and Broadway Streets. The Klinker Building, originally known as the Tajo Building when built, had been dubbed Los Angeles' first skyscraper. The building has since been demolished during the widening of First Street. The company was dissolved during the Great Depression, but Klinker later established Realty Title Company of Los Angeles where he worked until his death.

Klinker was married to Lydia Jane (Raver) until her death in 1916. They had five children, three of whom survived him: artist Orpha Klinker, screenwriter Zeno Klinker, who was senior writer for ventriloquist and entertainer Edgar Bergen on The Charlie McCarthy Show, and 1927 champion gymnast in tumbling, Elza C. Klinker. A second wife, Nellie, survived Lewis. The couple traveled around the world, during which time Klinker wrote a treatise on the Pyramid of Giza, titled God's Witness in Egypt, self-published in 1935.
