= United States Post Office and Courthouse (Los Angeles, California, 1892) =

First Los Angeles federal building

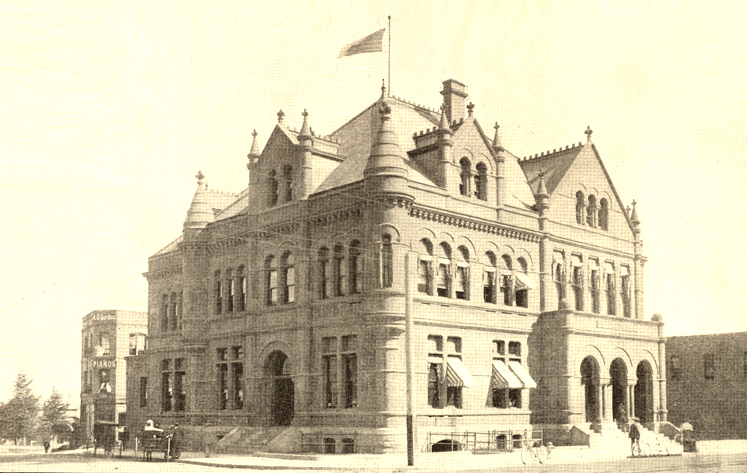
- Treasury Department photo c. 1892
- Interactive map of the United States Post Office and Courthouse area
- Alternative names: Los Angeles Federal Building

General information
- Coordinates: 34.0472°N 118.24772°W
- Opened: 1892
- Demolished: 1901

Height
- Architectural: Richardsonian Romanesque

The first Los Angeles federal building, more formally the Los Angeles Federal Courthouse and Post Office or U.S. Post Office and Custom House was a Richardsonian Romanesque red brick, brownstone and terra cotta structure designed by Will A. Freret. The building, located at the corner of Main Street and Winston Street, between Fourth and Fifth Streets, was used for about nine years, from 1892 to 1901, to house the Southern District of California, a U.S. post office, and the customs office. The building was partially demolished in 1901; Court moved to the Tajo Building in the meantime. The post office was housed at a series of locations until the second Los Angeles federal building opened in 1910.

== History ==
In 1887, Congress allocated funding for federal building number 198. The building was occupied in summer 1892 and the cost was said to be $150,000. The building, after a modest expansion, eventually contained three main floors, a basement and an attic, altogether offering approximately 460,000 cubic feet of workspace.

However, circa 1901, the building was deemed inadequate for the needs of the growing city, vacated, and partially but not wholly demolished. It was initially hoped that new construction on the same site could use some of the original framework. However, by 1905, as funding languished, the fenced-off ruin was generally described as a forlorn and hopeless wreck.

Meanwhile, the post office moved between a series of temporary quarters:

1. Armory building at Eighth and Spring
2. Grand and Seventh (before 1905)

The federal district court, the U.S. attorney and the U.S. marshal moved to fourth floor of the Tajo Building on the northwest corner of First and Broadway in 1901, and remained there until 1910.

The site of the first federal building was sold in October 1906 for $314,000. Construction on the replacement on the site of the former Downey Block began 1906 on donated land. Circa 1910, the various federal offices relocated to the second Los Angeles federal building.

== Gallery ==
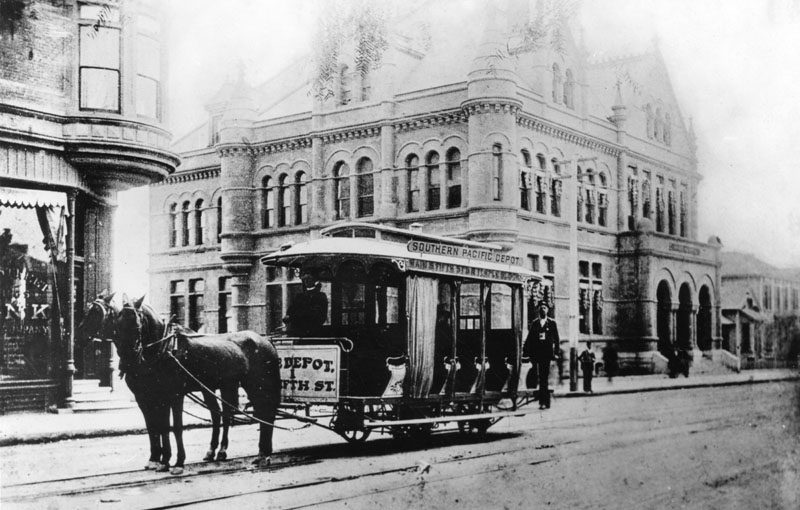
Horse-drawn streetcar in front of the Los Angeles post office on Main Street, circa 1892

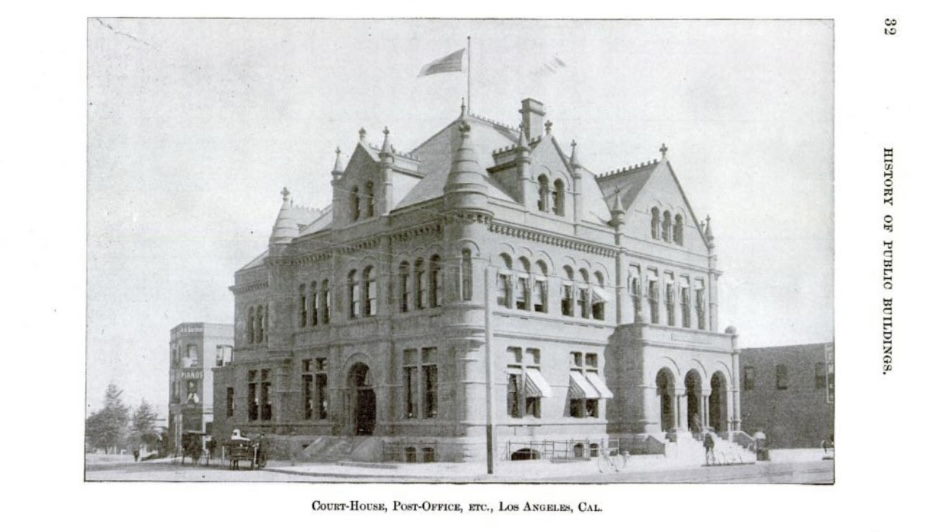
Los Angeles Courthouse and Post Office in A History of Public Buildings (1901)

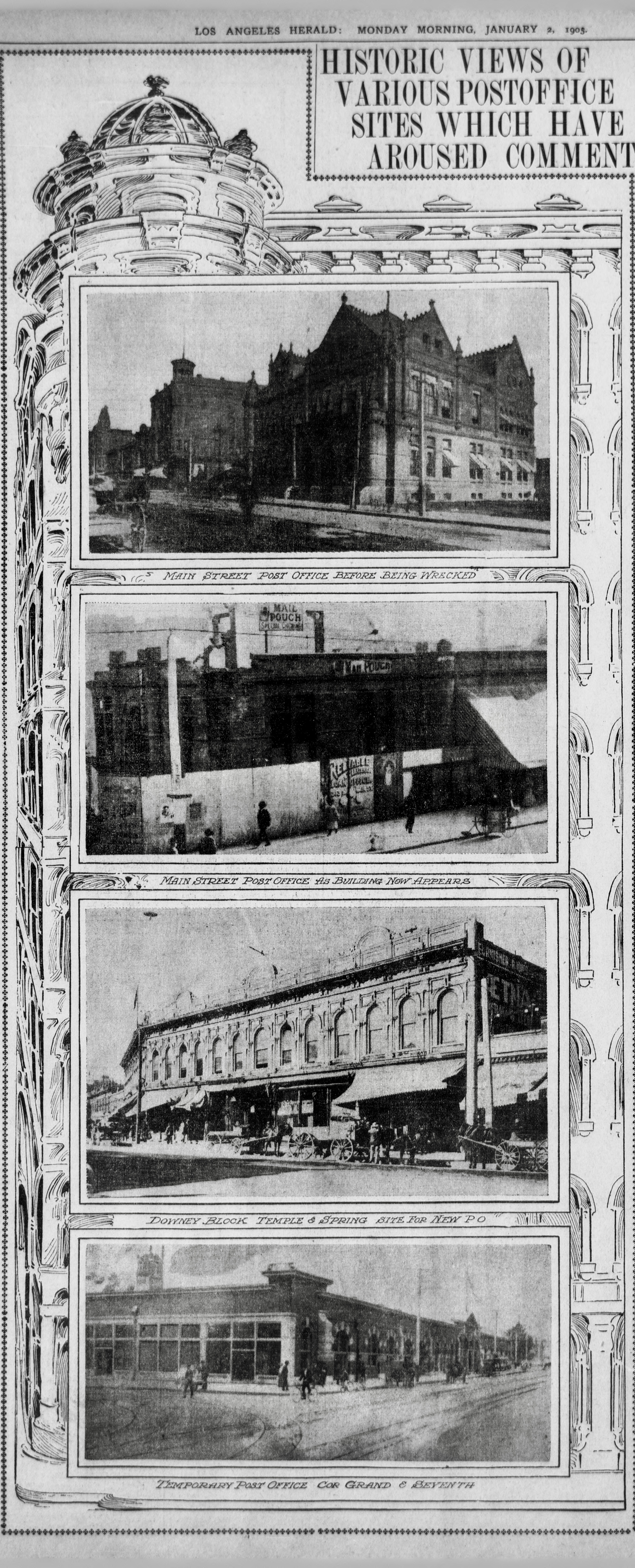
Post office photo gallery in Los Angeles Herald (1905)

== See also ==
- List of Los Angeles federal buildings
- List of United States federal courthouses in California
