= Orpha Klinker =

American painter

- Born: November 20, 1891; Fairfield, Iowa
- Died: May 23, 1964 (aged 72); Los Angeles, California
- Education: Académie Julian, Académie Colarossi

Orpha Mae Klinker (November 20, 1891 – May 23, 1964) was an American artist well known for her California plein air landscape paintings and etchings as well as her portraiture and early California historic sites. She was also an active illustrator and graphic designer. Klinker was recognized for her series of historical and pioneer paintings. She painted a series of portraits of notable Californians and memorialized many historic early California structures on canvas. On October 14, 1963, she was awarded a resolution by the City Council of Los Angeles, recognizing her outstanding professional skill and appreciation for the many honors she has brought to the city. The commendatory scroll praised Klinker for her role as an oil painter and mentioned many of her portrait subjects such as General John C. Frémont, Andrés Pico, José Antonio Carrillo and Dr. Joseph P. Widney.

== Early life and education ==
Orpha Klinker was born in Fairfield, Iowa on November 20, 1891, the firstborn of five children of Lewis William Klinker and Lydia Jane Raver. Her given name is a modification of the Biblical name Orpah. The family moved to California when she was a child, first to Chico, and eventually to Los Angeles. Klinker attended school in Los Angeles at Polytechnic High School, and later studied under noted California plein air painter mentors Anna Hills and Paul Lauritz. She traveled to Europe with fellow artist Crystal Wood Stephen to do further art studies at the Académie Julian and the Académie Colarossi, both in Paris, France.

== Public art ==
Four of Klinker's historic portraits are in the permanent collection of the Campo de Cahuenga historic site in Los Angeles, CA: John C. Fremont, Andres Pico, Mrs. A.S.C. Forbes, and Jose Antonio Carrillo. Klinker's oil portrait of former Los Angeles Mayor Frank L. Shaw hangs in the Los Angeles City Hall Tower in the gallery of mayors.

=== Civic projects ===
Orpha Klinker designed the County Seal of Los Angeles in 1939, winning a design competition for Los Angeles County for an insignia that represented commerce, shipping, agriculture, airplane manufacturing, the motion picture industry, the petroleum industry and recreation. This insignia was in use by the county until 1957.

=== Flag design and patriotic works ===
Klinker designed the official flag for the City of Beverly Hills in California prior to July 1960. The flag was presented to the City of Beverly Hills by Jimmy McHugh and the Native Daughters of the Golden West. It was adapted by Klinker for the city's 50th Anniversary Celebration in 1964. On Wednesday, February 23, 1955, California Congressman Gordon L. McDonough presented to the U. S. House of Representatives a new United States flag design created by Klinker incorporating two additional stars for the proposed statehood of Alaska and Hawaii. This was entered into Congressional Record on March 7, 1955. The new proposed design spelled the words "Freedom" with 50 white stars on a blue field. The record reflects, "The design created by Miss Klinker symbolizes the spirit of freedom which has ever represented the guiding principle of our American way of life, and when we again rearrange the stars of the flag, adoption of this design would truly represent within our flag this spirit of America." The proposed design change was not selected when the new 50-star U.S. flag was formally created. McDonough also cites in the Congressional Record one of Klinker's noted patriotic oil paintings. He states, "Among her famous works is her painting in which freedom of religion, freedom of the press, freedom from want, and freedom to petition the government of the United States are represented." The painting was exhibited publicly at the Wilshire Federal Savings & Loan art gallery in Los Angeles. Klinker's painting, titled Symbols of Freedom was purchased by the Republican Women's Committee and in 1962 was presented to former American Vice-President, Richard Nixon, prior to his American Presidency, at his mother's home in Whittier, California. Correspondence regarding this work resides at the Nixon Presidential Library and Museum in Yorba Linda, California.

== Illustration work ==
Klinker did commercial illustration work in fashion and furniture design during the 1920s in both Los Angeles and New York. She also created book illustrations and contributed to magazines.

=== Historical plates ===
Starting in the 1930s, she created more than 100 illustrated historical plate designs for Vernon Kilns company in California, a forerunner in the commemorative plate business. These plates, showing historical features of places throughout the United States, are collectibles.

=== Magazine illustration ===
While living in New York City, Klinker created a series of paper dolls with children's characters in the kewpie style featuring fashionable clothing of the 1920s. The series, The Betty Bobbs Family, featuring Betty Bobbs, Bonnie Bobbs, Bobby Bobbs and Baby Bobbs, was published in Pictorial Review magazine in 1925, in the January, February, May and July issues. They remain sought after as paper doll collectibles.

=== Book illustration ===
- Winning a Fortune by Lewis William Klinker, 1915, W.B. Conkey Company, Publishers. A novel about hydraulic gold mining with 6 full plate drawings.
- The City that Grew by Boyle Workman, 1935, The Southland Publishing Company, Los Angeles. Klinker did 36 of the drawings in this richly illustrated history of Los Angeles from 1840 to 1936.
- Enchanted Pueblo by Ed Ainsworth, 1959, Bank of America, N.T. & S.A. The Story of the Rise of the Modern Metropolis Around The Plaza de Los Angeles.
- Goodbye, Death Valley! by L. Burr Belden, 1956, Desert Magazine Press, Palm Desert, CA. The Story of the 1849 Jayhawker Escape

=== Fashion illustration ===
Beginning in the 1920s, Klinker's work focused on fashion illustration for retail stores, furniture firms, magazines and pattern companies. Examples of her fashion work appeared in spreads in the Los Angeles Times feature pages to introduce the new season trends. Using multiple figures in elaborate settings, she illustrated the finest in women's 1920s to 1930s styles. Her signature appeared in these omnibus drawings.

=== Greeting cards ===
Beginning in 1930, Klinker and her brother Zeno Klinker collaborated to form the Klinker Kraft Kard Company. They created a new line of humorous greeting cards during the Depression, a style they called burlesque cards, that was illustrated by Orpha and written by Zeno.

=== War effort ===
During World War II, Klinker created pastel portraits for more than 1000 United States military personnel at various Veterans Hospitals. An exhibition of some of these portraits were widely shown, including a show at the Bowers Museum in Santa Ana, California.

== Exhibitions ==
- Exhibition in the Galeria, Ebell Club of Los Angeles, California, May 1929.
- Golden Gate Exposition, San Francisco, California, 1939.
- Exhibition at Ebell Los Angeles Club of Klinker's paintings created in Mexico. Luncheon and program attended by Mexican Vice-Consul Porfirio Romay in April, 1943.
- Historical Adobes and Portraits of Early California Pioneers, Solo Exhibition. J.W. Robinson Co., Seventh Floor, Los Angeles, California. May 1935.
- Paintings of historic places, people and trees of California, Southwest Museum, Solo Exhibition. Los Angeles, California. May through June, 1953.
- Historical Paintings by Orpha Klinker, Southwest Museum, Los Angeles California, Feb-March, 1955.
- Wilshire Federal Savings and Loan Art Gallery exhibition, Los Angeles, California. May 1958.
- A Memorial...The Many Arts of Orpha Klinker. Solo Exhibition. The Charles W. Bowers Memorial Museum, Santa Ana, California. Dec. 3-20, 1966.
- Santa Barbara Trust for Historic Preservation: Orpha Klinker and Bill Dewey—Landmarks of California. July 18, through October 19, 2014. Juxtaposition of Klinker oils and watercolors of California landmarks and Dewey's photographs from 2008 of sites as they are now.

== Affiliations, personal life, and death ==
Klinker served as president of the Women Painters of the West. She was also a member of the California Art Club, the Society of American Etchers, and the San Fernando Valley Professional Artists Guild.

Klinker married twice. In the mid 1930s, some of her work was signed with her married name at the time, Orpha Klinker Carpenter.

Klinker died in Los Angeles on May 23, 1964.
