= Van Nuys Government Center =

Local, state and federal government offices

The Van Nuys Government Center (aka Van Nuys Civic Center or San Fernando Valley Administrative Center) is a 17.3-acre (70,000 m^{2}) cluster of buildings in the Van Nuys neighborhood of Los Angeles that houses various local, state and federal government offices and services. It is an important regional hub in the decentralized city of Los Angeles, roughly by bounded by Calvert Street, Sylvan Street, Tyrone Avenue and Van Nuys Boulevard. (Similar hubs include West Valley Civic Center in Reseda and West Los Angeles Civic Center in Sawtelle.)

Many of the buildings are fronted by an open plaza and garden areas established in 1966 in the area "surrounded by the Valley Police Headquarters, Van Nuys Library and county courts building under construction."

Facilities
Building	Government level	Description	Address	Coordinates	Image
Van Nuys City Hall	City – Los Angeles	Established 1932 as a "branch city hall"; location of City Council District 6 field office and the Los Angeles Mayor's Valley field office.	14410 Sylvan St, Van Nuys, CA 91401	34.1842°N 118.4470°W	
Marvin Braude San Fernando Valley Constituent Service Center	City – Los Angeles	Los Angeles City Attorney, Los Angeles Department of Building and Safety	6262 Van Nuys Blvd., Van Nuys, CA 91401	34.1843°N 118.4486°W	
James C. Corman Federal Building	National – United States	Local offices for U.S. government bureaus and departments including offices of the Internal Revenue Service, the State Department and the Marine Corps.	6230 Van Nuys Blvd., Los Angeles, CA 91401	34.1836°N 118.4479°W	
Van Nuys State Office Building	State – California	Assemblymember offices, California Department of Industrial Relations, other state regulators	6150 Van Nuys Blvd., Los Angeles, CA 91401	34.1819°N 118.4481°W	
Los Angeles County Service Center	County – Los Angeles	Los Angeles County Registrar-Recorder/County Clerk; marriage ceremonies can be performed by Van Nuys office; also obtain/file birth, death, marriage certificates; documentation of real property, real estate and fictitious business name filings	14340 W. Sylvan St., Los Angeles, CA 91401	34.1845277°N 118.4460195°W	
Van Nuys Courthouse	State – California	Los Angeles County Superior Court has two buildings (east and west) across the street from one another; the older building dates to 1965	6230 Sylmar Ave (East) & 14400 Erwin St Mall (West)		
Van Nuys Police Division	City – Los Angeles	Los Angeles Police Department precinct	6240 Sylmar Ave., Los Angeles, CA 91401	34.1838°N 118.4445°W	
Van Nuys Branch Library	City – Los Angeles	One of the 72 branches in the Los Angeles Public Library system	6250 Sylmar Ave, Van Nuys, CA 91401	34.1838°N 118.4465°W	
Van Nuys Civic Childhood Development Center		Daycare and preschool	14350 Sylvan St, Van Nuys, CA 91401	34.1844°N 118.4464°W	

== Access ==
A city-operated parking structure is located at 14517 Erwin Street.

Van Nuys station and the G Line Bikeway for cyclists and pedestrians are one block away from the government center.

The Van Nuys/Studio City DASH loop has served the Van Nuys Government Center since 1992.
