= United States Courthouse (First Street, Los Angeles) =

Federal courtrooms and offices, opened 2016

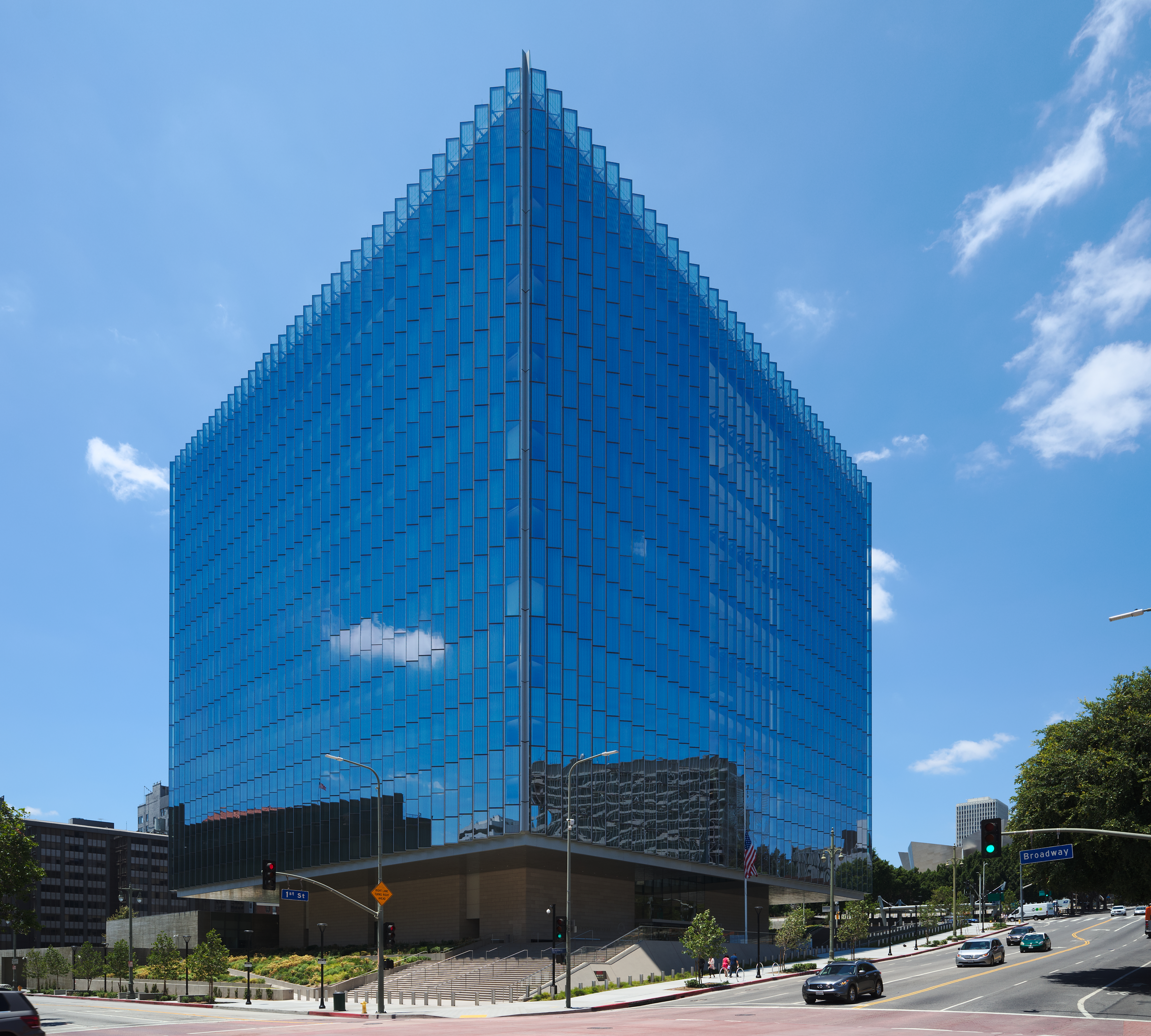
- New federal courthouse, 1st and Hill Streets, Los Angeles
- Interactive map of the United States Courthouse area
- Alternative names: First Street Courthouse

General information
- Location: 350 W. First Street, Los Angeles, California, United States
- Coordinates: 34.0536°N 118.2465°W
- Completed: August 2016
- Opened: 2016

Technical details
- Floor count: 10
- Floor area: 633,000 ft^{2} (58,800 m^{2})

Design and construction
- Architecture firm: Skidmore, Owings & Merrill LLP
- Main contractor: Clark Construction Group, Jacobs

Other information
- Public transit: at Historic Broadway at Civic Center/Grand Park at 1st & Hill

The United States Courthouse at 350 W. First Street in the Civic Center district of downtown Los Angeles opened in October 2016. The building, which houses federal courts and federal law-enforcement departments, is sometimes called the First Street Courthouse.

It is 10 stories tall with 533,000 square feet (49,500 m^{2}) of floor space, containing 24 courtrooms and 32 judicial chambers and stands out in the downtown skyline with its impressive glass façade. Emphasis was on the building's being sustainable, secure and cost-effective, according to the GSA which oversaw the project to build the new courthouse, and to optimize court operations, address security concerns, and provide space for the U.S. District Court in Los Angeles. It consolidates many functions that previously were spread across multiple buildings. Major tenants are the U.S. District Court serving the Central District of California, U.S. Marshals Service, GSA, federal public defender (trial preparation space), and U.S. Attorney's office (trial preparation space).

The building features public artworks by local artists Catherine Opie (Yosemite Falls), Mary Corse (lobby hanging), and Gary Simmons (six-panel lobby piece).

== See also ==
- Edward R. Roybal Federal Building and United States Courthouse
- List of United States federal courthouses in California
- List of Los Angeles federal buildings
