= Edward R. Roybal Federal Building and United States Courthouse =

United States federal courthouse and federal building in Los Angeles, California

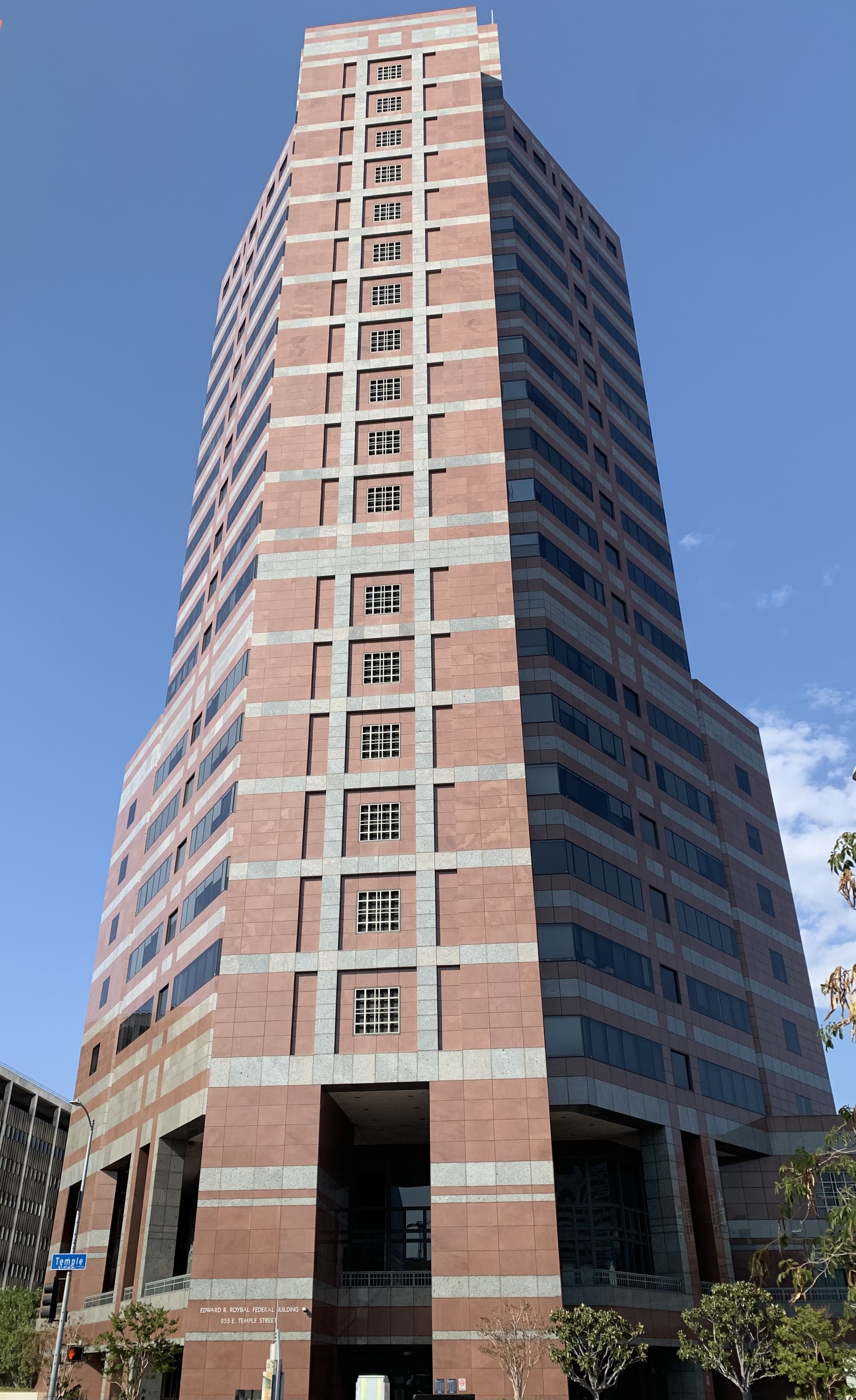
- Interactive map of the Edward R. Roybal Federal Building and United States Courthouse area

General information
- Location: 255 East Temple Street, Los Angeles, California
- Coordinates: 34°3′11.96″N 118°14′21.07″W
- Completed: 1991

Height
- Height: 366 feet (112 m)

Design and construction
- Architecture firm: Welton Becket Associates

Website
- www.gsa.gov/edwardrroybal

The Edward R. Roybal Federal Building and United States Courthouse is a United States federal courthouse of the United States District Court for the Central District of California, in the Civic Center district of Los Angeles, California. It is located on Temple Street in Downtown Los Angeles, east of and adjacent to the Federal Building at 300 N. Los Angeles Street, architect Welton Becket, opened in 1965.

The building was completed in January 1992 and is named for long-serving United States Congressman Edward R. Roybal. In the year after its completion, 1993, it gained publicity as the site of the federal trial of the four Los Angeles Police Department officers who were charged in 1991's Rodney King video beating; the trial being held the year after their acquittals in state court in Simi Valley.

Prior to the opening of the building, some controversy was stirred by the removal of a statue of a nude by sculptor Tom Otterness, which Roybal had objected to as appropriate for a museum but not for a federal building.

== See also ==
- United States Courthouse (First Street, Los Angeles)
- List of Los Angeles federal buildings
- List of United States federal courthouses in California
